= Lobesia euphorbiana =

Scientific classification
- Domain: Eukaryota
- Kingdom: Animalia
- Phylum: Arthropoda
- Class: Insecta
- Order: Lepidoptera
- Family: Tortricidae
- Genus: Lobesia
- Species: L. euphorbiana

Binomial name
- Lobesia euphorbiana (Freyer, 1842)

Species of moth

Lobesia euphorbiana is a species of moth, belonging to the family Tortricidae.

It is native to Europe.
