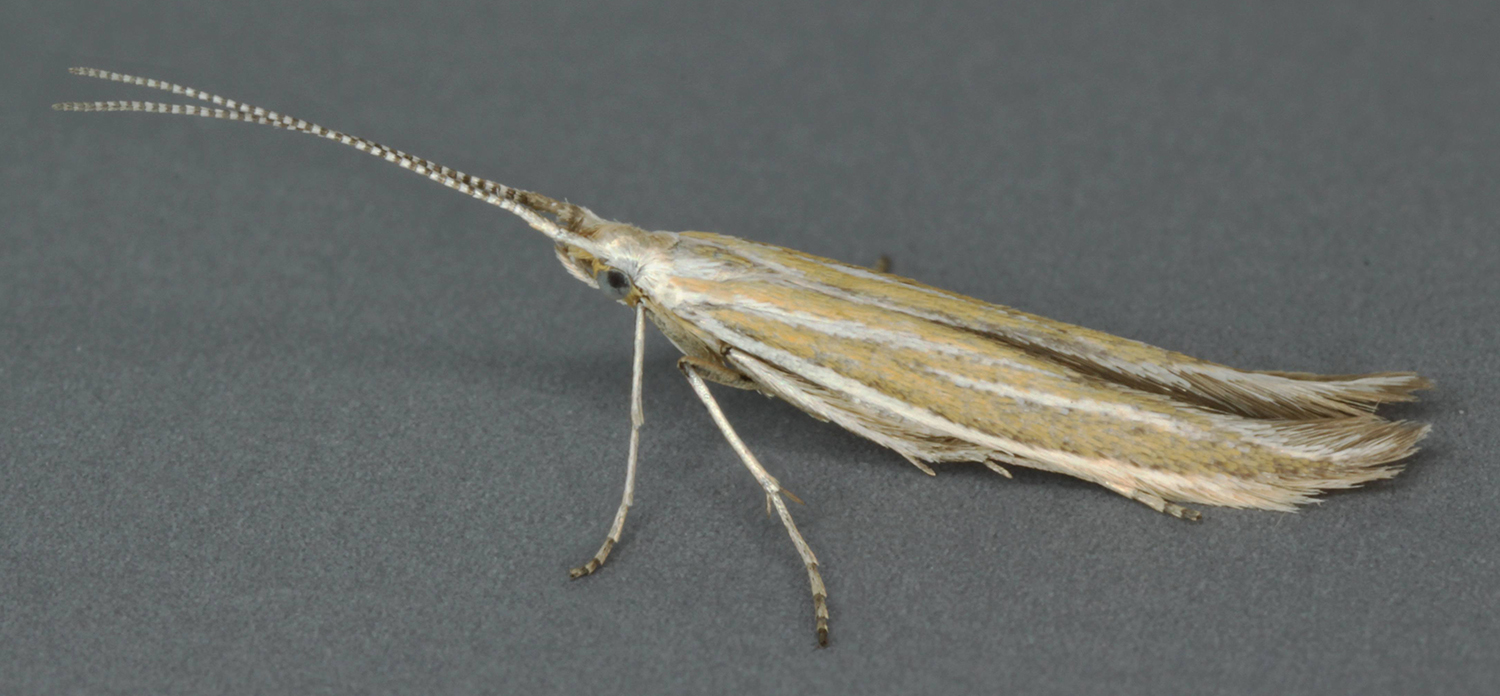
- Coleophora albicosta, Fenn's Moss, North Wales
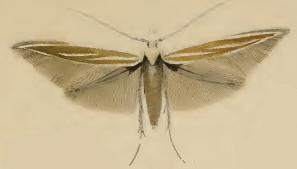

Scientific classification
- Kingdom: Animalia
- Phylum: Arthropoda
- Class: Insecta
- Order: Lepidoptera
- Family: Coleophoridae
- Genus: Coleophora
- Species: C. albicosta

Binomial name
- Coleophora albicosta (Haworth, 1828)

Synonyms
- Porrectaria albicosta Haworth, 1828; Coleophora fraudulentella Toll, 1944

= Coleophora albicosta =

Species of moth

The testaceous white-back (Coleophora albicosta) is a moth of the family Coleophoridae. It is found in most of western Europe.

The wingspan is about 14 mm. Head pale ochreous, sides whitish. Antennae white, ringed with fuscous, basal joint ochreous-tinged, with rough spreading scales. Forewings light ochreous-yellowish, sprinkled with light fuscous, especially towards costa; a white costal streak from base to near apex; a white line in disc from before middle to termen, one along fold, and one along dorsum to apex. Hindwings grey.

Adults are on wing from June to July.

== Gallery ==
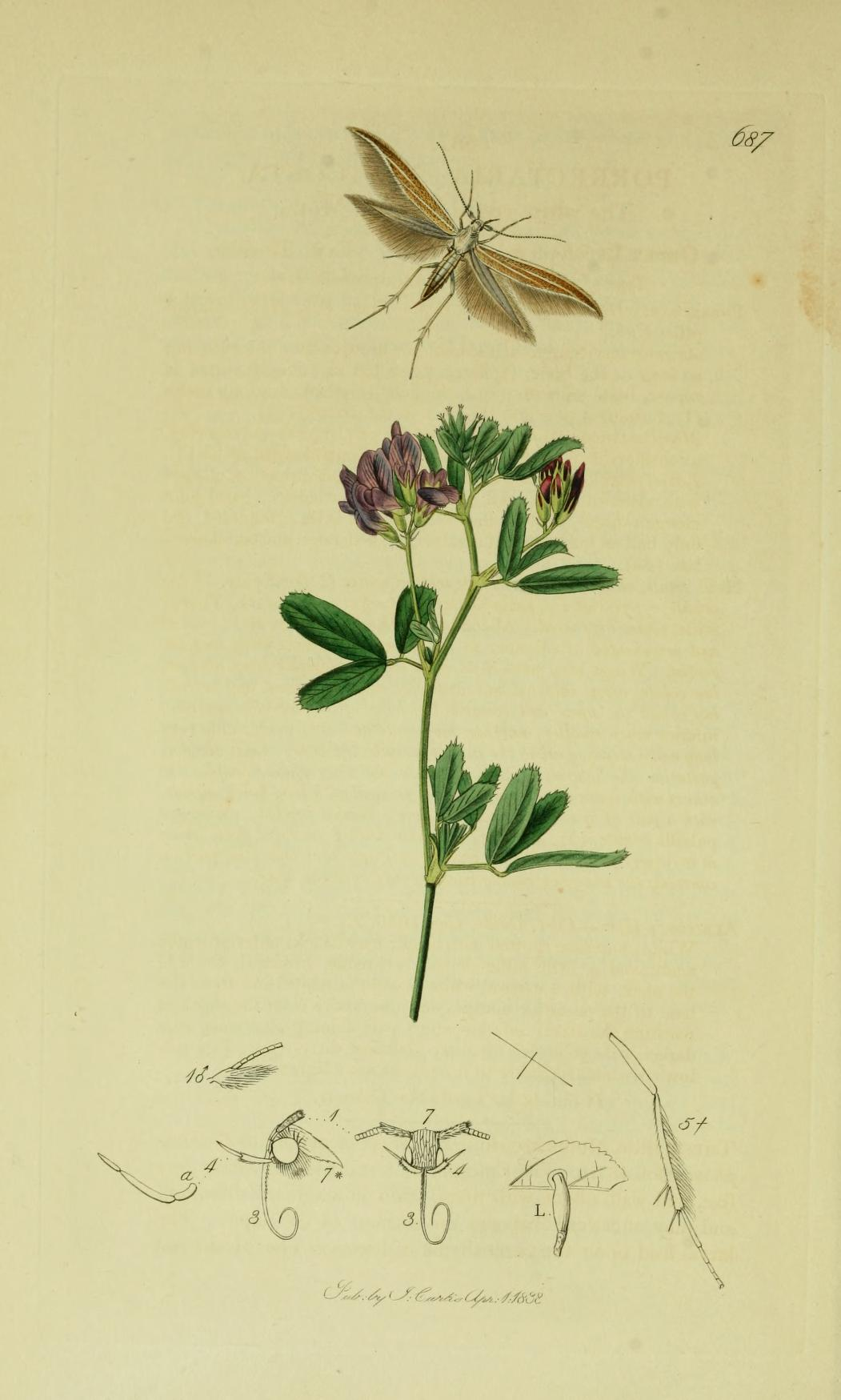
Illustration from John Curtis's British Entomology Volume 6

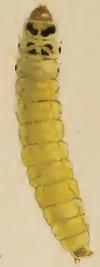
Larva

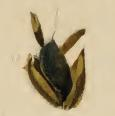
Pod of Ulex europaeus with two larval cases attached
