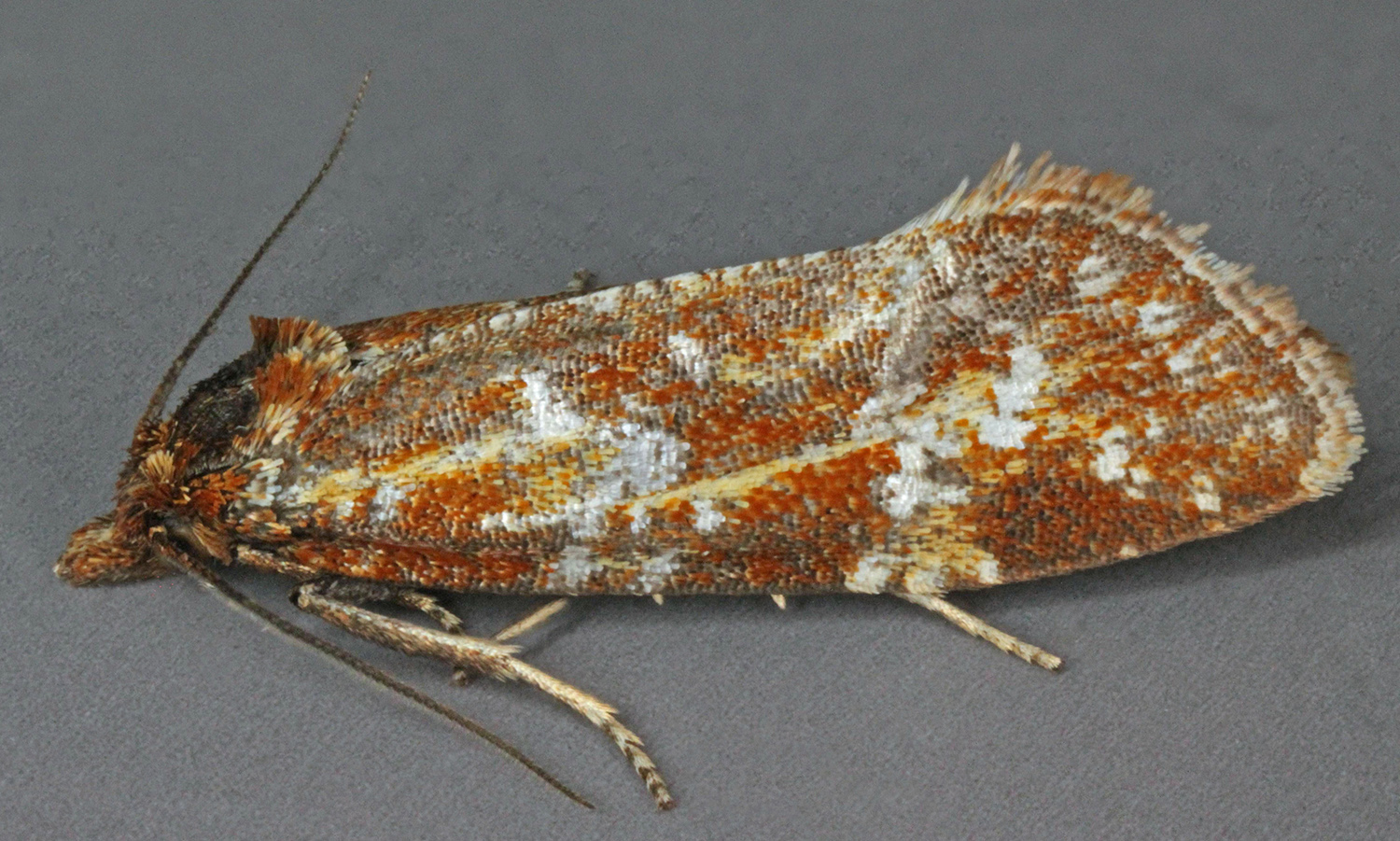

Scientific classification
- Kingdom: Animalia
- Phylum: Arthropoda
- Clade: Pancrustacea
- Class: Insecta
- Order: Lepidoptera
- Family: Tortricidae
- Genus: Aethes
- Species: A. piercei

Binomial name
- Aethes piercei Obraztsov, 1952

Synonyms
- Phalaena gemmatella Scopoli, 1763

= Aethes piercei =

Species of moth

Aethes piercei, the devil's-bit conch, is a species of moth of the family Tortricidae. It is found in central, southern and western Europe. The habitat consists of damp areas, including marshes and fens.

The wingspan is 14–24 millimetres (0.55–0.94 in). Adults are on wing from June to July.

The larvae feed on Succisa pratensis. They feed in the roots of their host plant.
