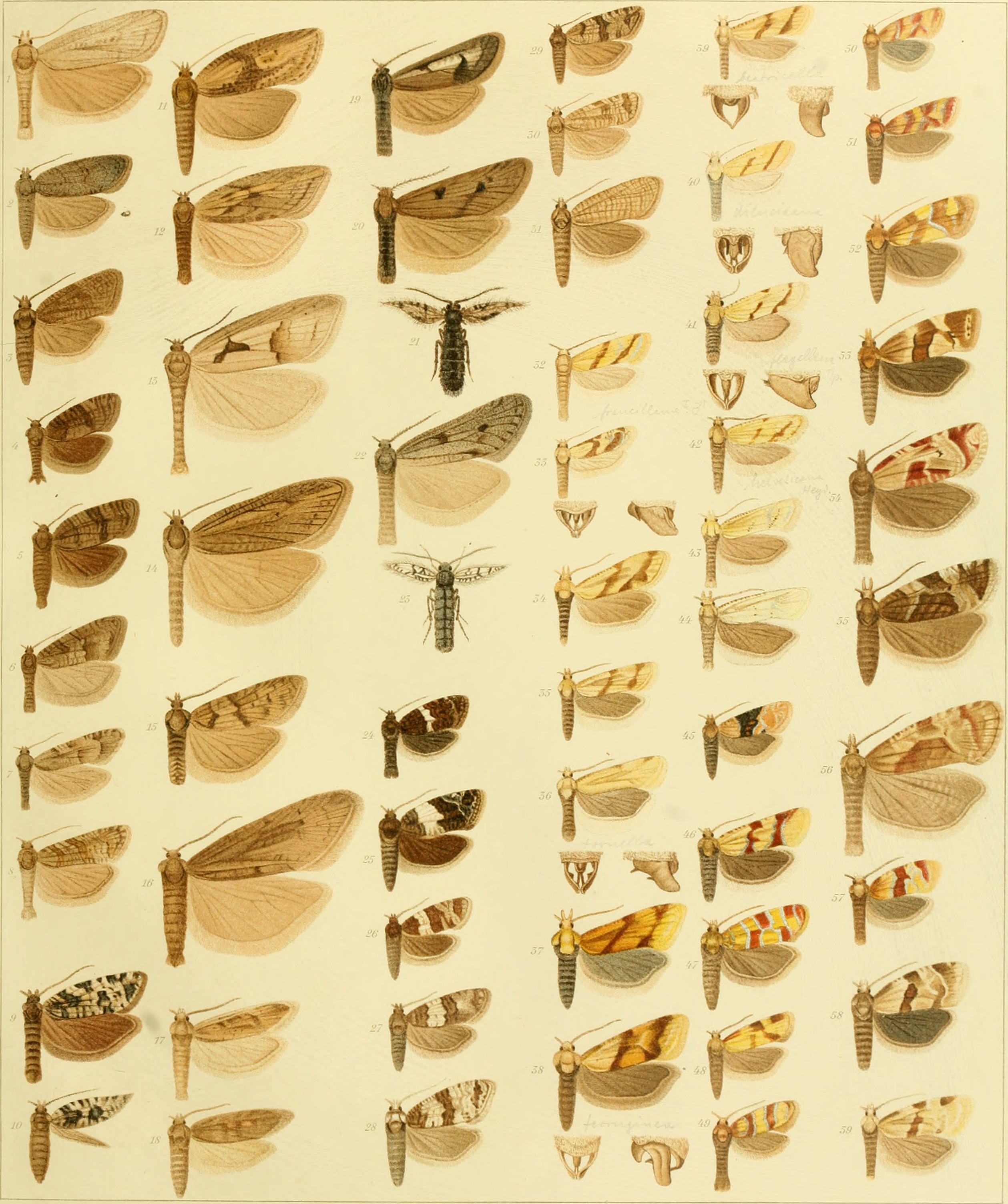
- Aethes tornella as Lozopera tornella in Die palaearktischen tortriciden figure 35

Scientific classification
- Kingdom: Animalia
- Phylum: Arthropoda
- Clade: Pancrustacea
- Class: Insecta
- Order: Lepidoptera
- Family: Tortricidae
- Genus: Aethes
- Species: A. tornella

Binomial name
- Aethes tornella (Walsingham, 1898)

Synonyms
- Lozopera tornella Walsingham, 1898

= Aethes tornella =

Species of moth

Aethes tornella is a species of moth of the family Tortricidae. It was described by Walsingham in 1898. It is found on Corsica, Sardinia and Sicily and in the Netherlands, Belgium, Germany, on the Iberian Peninsula, in Italy, Austria, Bulgaria, Romania, North Macedonia, the eastern Palearctic realm, and Asia Minor.

The wingspan is 14–17 millimetres (0.55–0.67 in). Adults are on wing from May to July.
