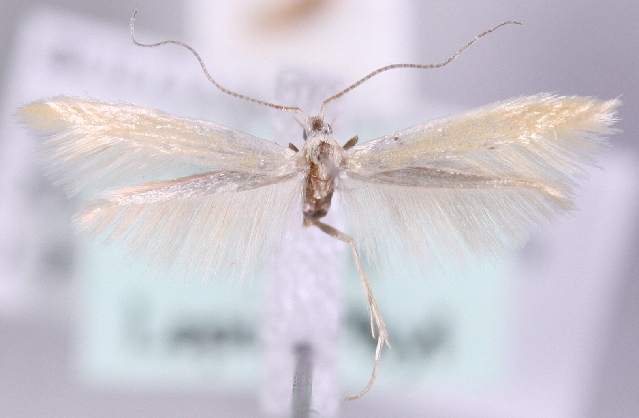

Scientific classification
- Kingdom: Animalia
- Phylum: Arthropoda
- Class: Insecta
- Order: Lepidoptera
- Family: Coleophoridae
- Genus: Coleophora
- Species: C. hydrolapathella

Binomial name
- Coleophora hydrolapathella Hering, 1921

= Coleophora hydrolapathella =

Species of moth

Coleophora hydrolapathella is a moth of the family Coleophoridae. It is found from Great Britain to Poland, Slovakia, Hungary and Romania and from Norway and Sweden to Belgium, Germany and Austria. It is also known from Latvia and southern Russia.

The wingspan is 13–14 mm. Adults are on wing from June to early August in one generation per year.
