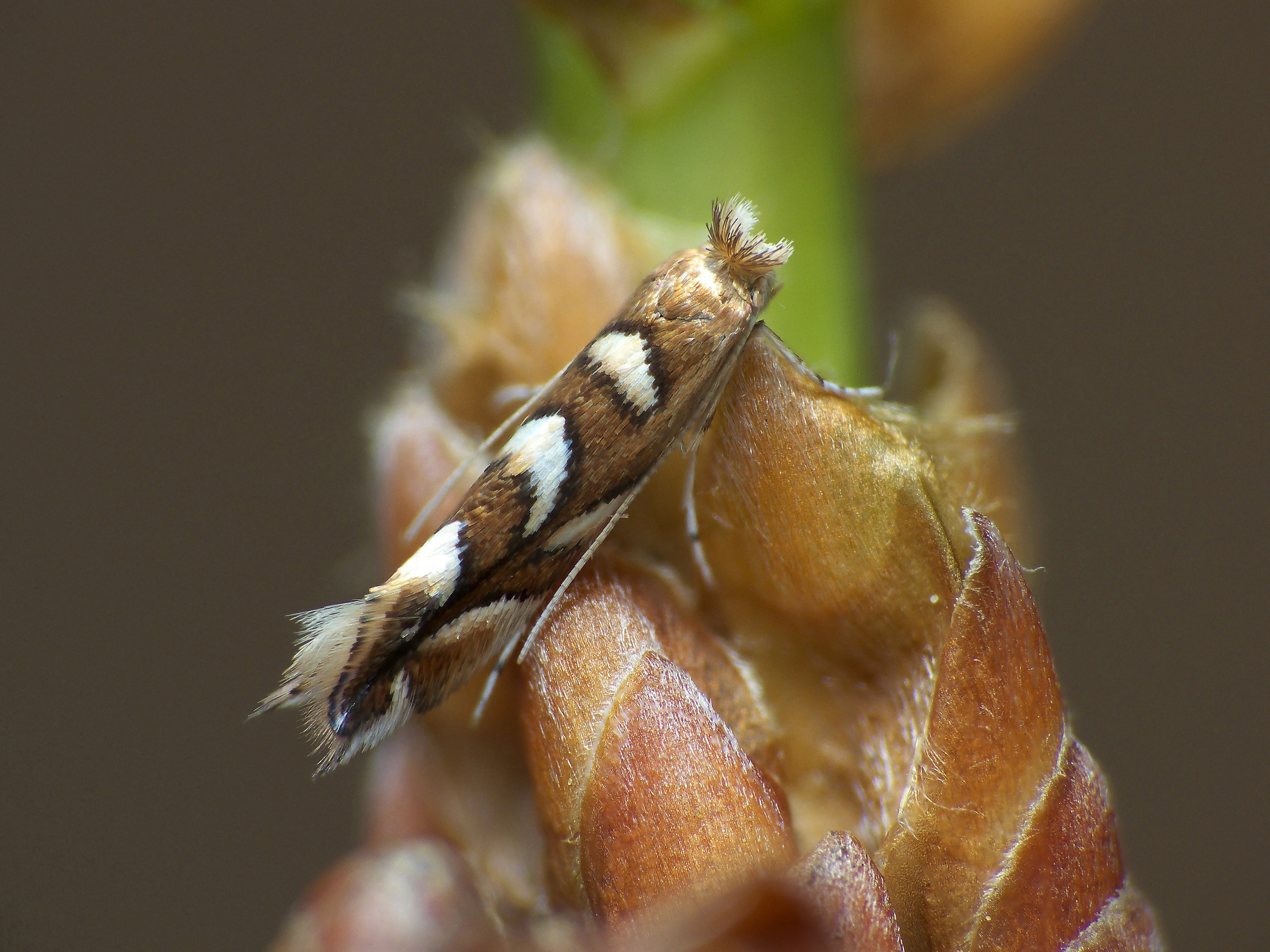

Scientific classification
- Kingdom: Animalia
- Phylum: Arthropoda
- Clade: Pancrustacea
- Class: Insecta
- Order: Lepidoptera
- Family: Gracillariidae
- Genus: Phyllonorycter
- Species: P. muelleriella

Binomial name
- Phyllonorycter muelleriella (Zeller, 1839)

Synonyms
- Lithocolletis muelleriella Zeller, 1839; Elachista amyotella Duponchel, 1840

= Phyllonorycter muelleriella =

Species of moth

Phyllonorycter muelleriella is a moth of the family Gracillariidae. It is found from the Baltic States to the Pyrenees, Italy and Greece and from Great Britain to central and southern Russia.

The wingspan is about 8 millimetres (0.31 in). Adults are on wing in May and again in August in two generations per year.

The larvae feed on Quercus cerris, Quercus petraea, Quercus pubescens and Quercus robur species. They mine the leaves of their host plant.
