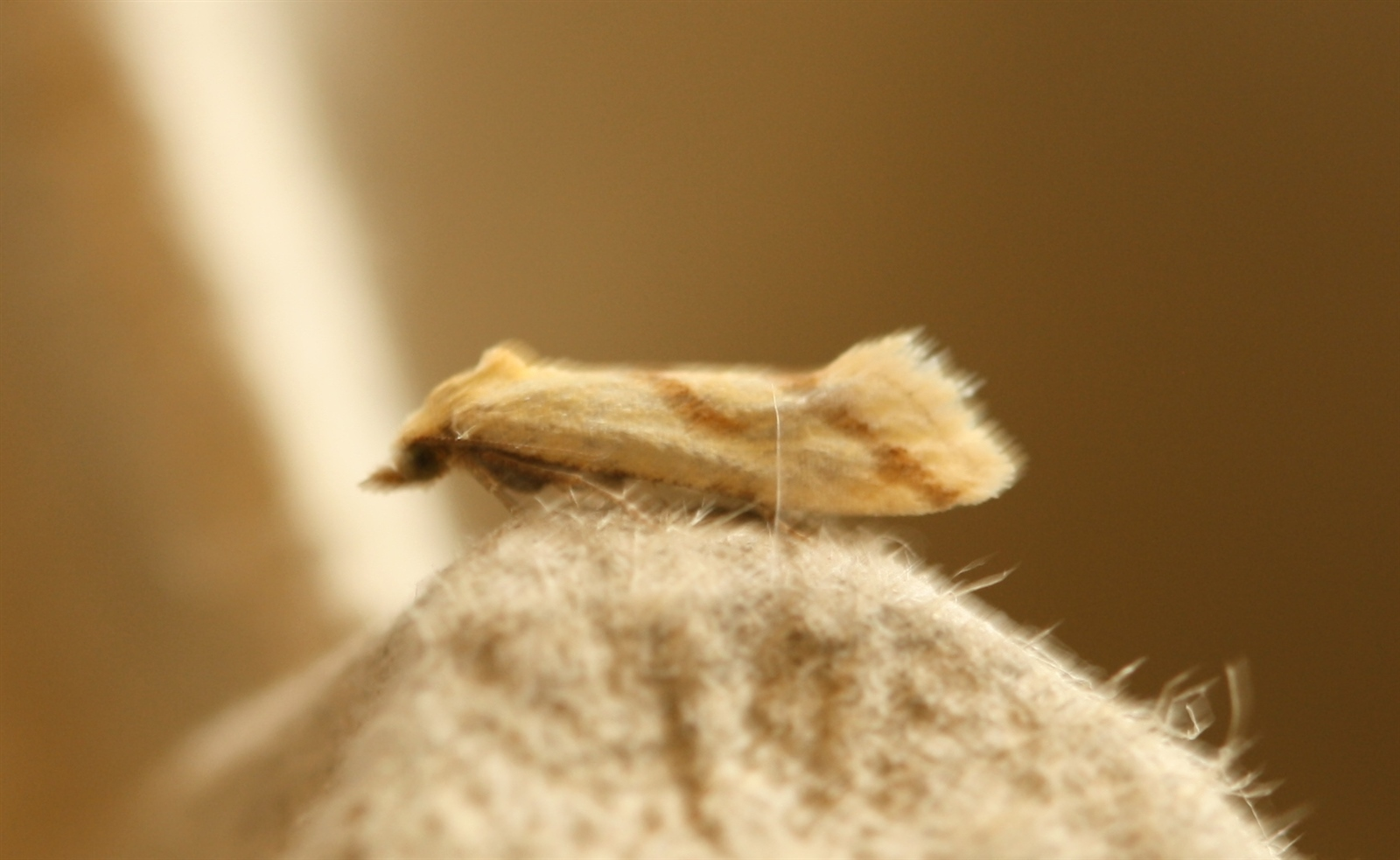

Scientific classification
- Domain: Eukaryota
- Kingdom: Animalia
- Phylum: Arthropoda
- Class: Insecta
- Order: Lepidoptera
- Family: Tortricidae
- Genus: Aethes
- Species: A. dilucidana

Binomial name
- Aethes dilucidana (Stephens, 1852)

Synonyms
- Lozopera dilucidana Stephens, 1852

= Aethes dilucidana =

Short-barred yellow conch

Species of moth

Aethes dilucidana, the short-barred yellow conch, is a species of moth of the family Tortricidae. It was described by James Francis Stephens in 1852. It is found in most of Europe, Algeria, southern Siberia, Kazakhstan, Turkmenistan, Kyrgyzstan and Iran.

The wingspan is 14–15 millimetres (0.55–0.59 in). Adults are on wing from June to July.

The larvae feed on Peucedanum sativum, Pastinaca sativa and Heracleum sphondylium. Larvae can be found from August to April.

== Subspecies ==
- Aethes dilucidana dilucidana
- Aethes dilucidana eberti Sutter & Karisch, 2004 (Iran: Elburs Mountains)
