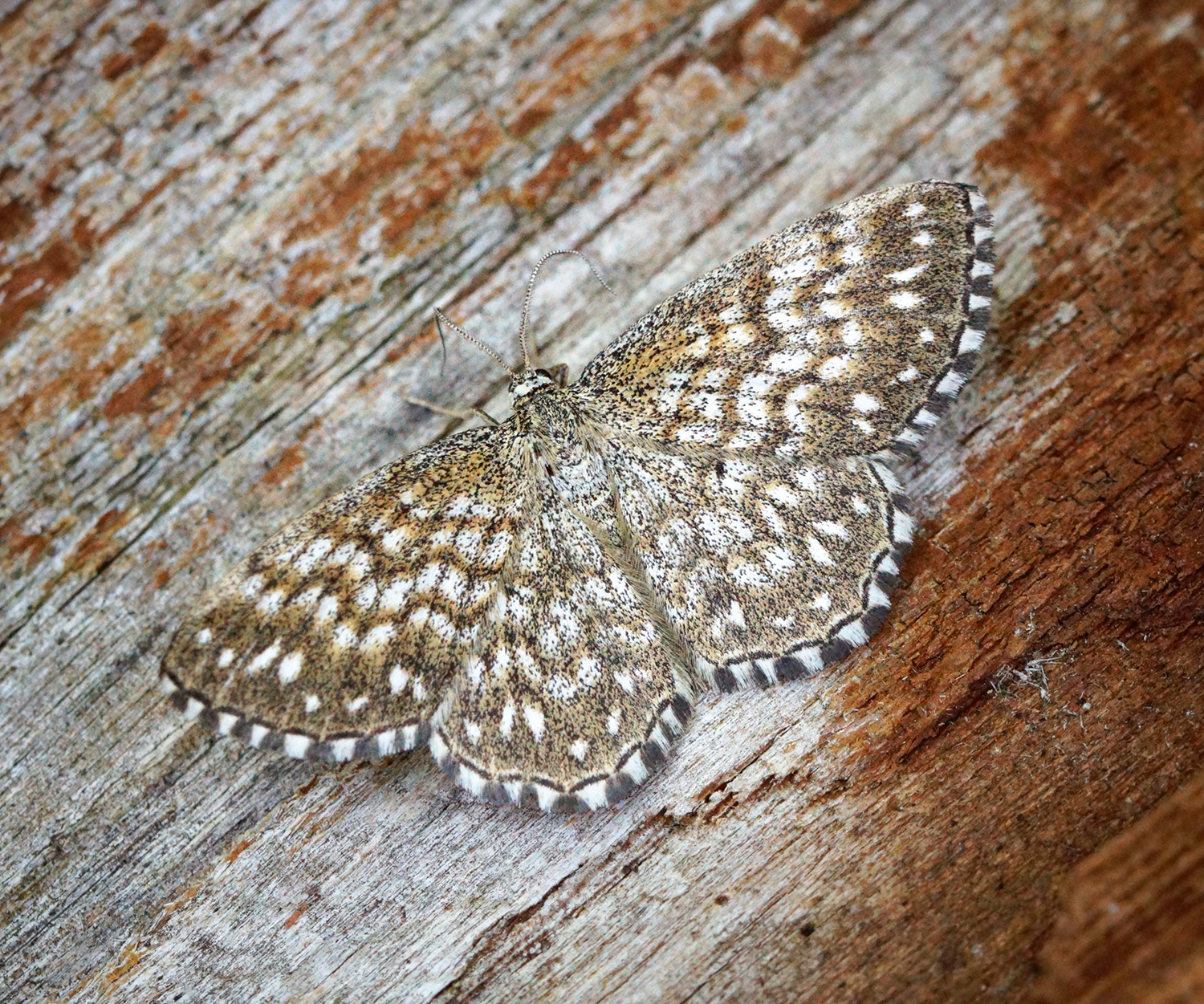
- Scopula tesselaria

Scientific classification
- Domain: Eukaryota
- Kingdom: Animalia
- Phylum: Arthropoda
- Class: Insecta
- Order: Lepidoptera
- Family: Geometridae
- Genus: Scopula
- Species: S. tessellaria

Binomial name
- Scopula tessellaria (Boisduval, 1840)

Synonyms
- Strenia tessellaria Boisduval, 1840; Eupisteria pulverulentaria Selys-Longchamps, 1844; Acidalia tabianaria Turati, 1905; Scopula tessellaria guillaumei Leraut, 2005

= Scopula tessellaria =

Species of geometer moth in subfamily Sterrhinae

Scopula tessellaria, the dusky-brown wave, is a moth of the family Geometridae. It is found in Belgium, Luxembourg, France, Germany, Italy, Spain, Albania, former Yugoslavia, Croatia, Bulgaria, Romania, North Macedonia, Greece, Moldova, Ukraine and Russia. In the east, the range extends to the Near East and the eastern part of the Palaearctic realm.

The larvae are polyphagous and have been recorded feeding on various low-growing plants, including Origanum species.

== Subspecies ==
- Scopula tessellaria tessellaria
- Scopula tessellaria proutiana Sheljuzhko, 1955

== Taxonomy ==
Scopula tessellaria guillaumei was described from the Alps of southern France, however, further research has shown that it is just an altitudinal form.
