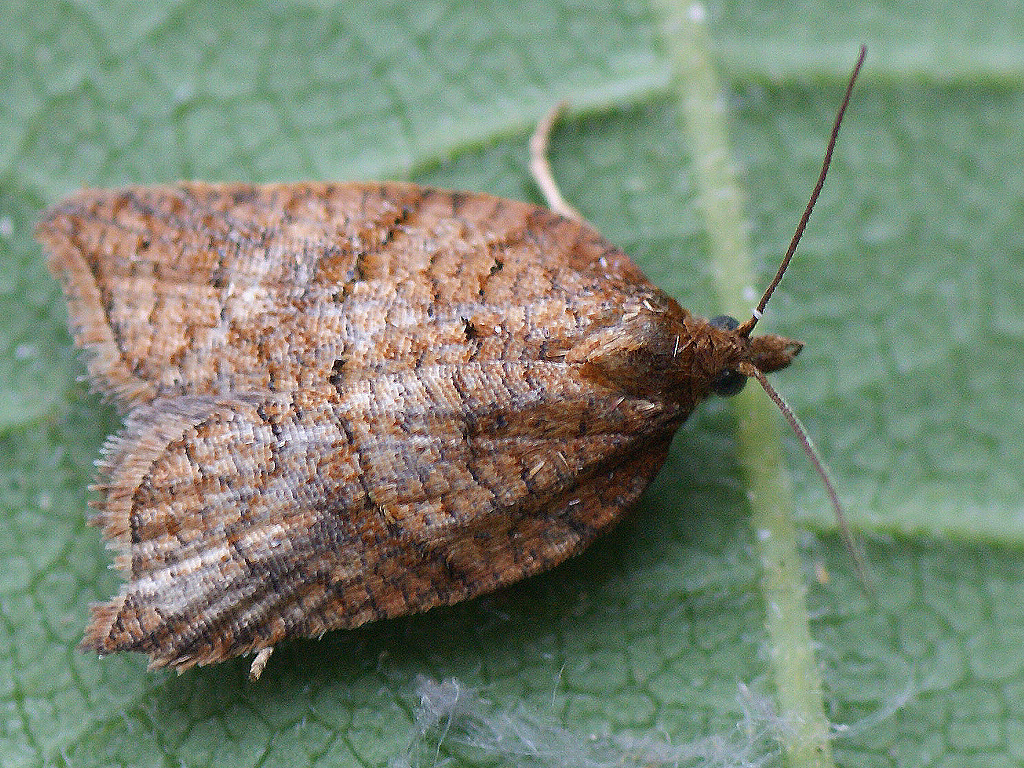

Scientific classification
- Kingdom: Animalia
- Phylum: Arthropoda
- Clade: Pancrustacea
- Class: Insecta
- Order: Lepidoptera
- Family: Tortricidae
- Genus: Acleris
- Species: A. shepherdana

Binomial name
- Acleris shepherdana (Stephens, 1852)

Synonyms
- Paramesia shepherdana Stephens, 1852

= Acleris shepherdana =

Species of moth

Acleris shepherdana, the meadow-sweet button, is a species of moth of the family Tortricidae. It is found in Europe, where it has been recorded from Great Britain, France, the Benelux, Germany, Denmark, Austria, Switzerland, Italy, the Czech Republic, Slovakia, Poland, Hungary, Norway, Sweden, Finland, the Baltic region and European Russia. It is also found in the Russian Far East (Ussuri), Manchuria, Mongolia, China and Japan. The habitat consists of fens, marshes, river-banks and other damp areas.

The wingspan is 13–16 mm. Adults are on wing from mid-June to the end of September.

The larvae feed on Spiraea ulmaria, Sanguisorba officinalis, Sanguisorba parviflora, Ulmaria and Filipendula species (including Filipendula kamtschatica).
