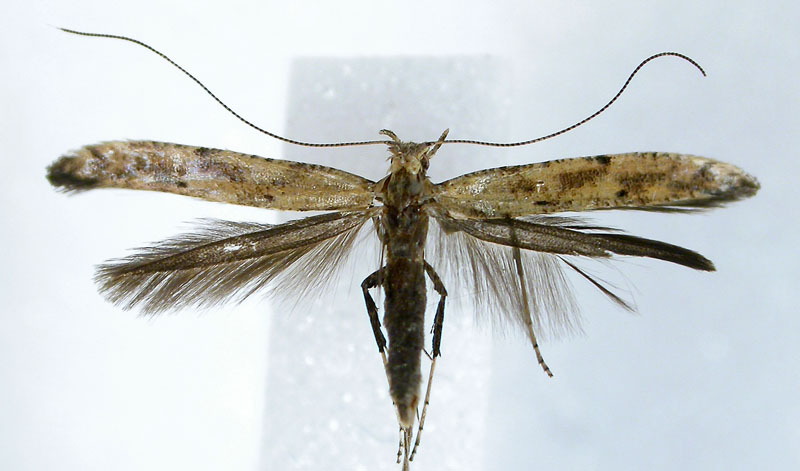

Scientific classification
- Kingdom: Animalia
- Phylum: Arthropoda
- Clade: Pancrustacea
- Class: Insecta
- Order: Lepidoptera
- Family: Gracillariidae
- Genus: Caloptilia
- Species: C. populetorum

Binomial name
- Caloptilia populetorum (Zeller, 1839)

Synonyms
- Gracillaria populetorum

= Caloptilia populetorum =

Species of moth

Caloptilia populetorum (commonly known as clouded slender) is a moth of the family Gracillariidae. It is found in most of Europe, except Italy, the Balkan Peninsula and the Mediterranean islands.

The wingspan is 11–14 millimetres (0.43–0.55 in). The forewings are whitish ochreous, irregularly tinged and clouded with fuscous; margins dotted with black; a small black spot on middle of costa blackish dots on fold at 1/3 and 2/3. Hindwings are dark grey. The larva is green-whitish; head very pale brownish.

Adults are on wing from August onwards, overwintering after which they may be seen until April or May.

Although the scientific name populetorum might suggest the larvae feed on poplar, they only feed on the leaves of Betula species, including Betula pendula and Betula pubescens. Initially they feed in a gallery and later they roll a leaf and feed within.
