= Phyllonorycter tenerella =

Scientific classification
- Domain: Eukaryota
- Kingdom: Animalia
- Phylum: Arthropoda
- Class: Insecta
- Order: Lepidoptera
- Family: Gracillariidae
- Genus: Phyllonorycter
- Species: P. tenerella

Binomial name
- Phyllonorycter tenerella (de Joannis, 1915)

Synonyms
- Lithocolletis tenerella de Joannis, 1915; Lithocolletis tenella Zeller, 1846

Species of moth

Phyllonorycter tenerella is a moth of the family Gracillariidae. It is found from Sweden to the Pyrenees, Italy and Bulgaria and from Great Britain to north-western Russia and Ukraine.

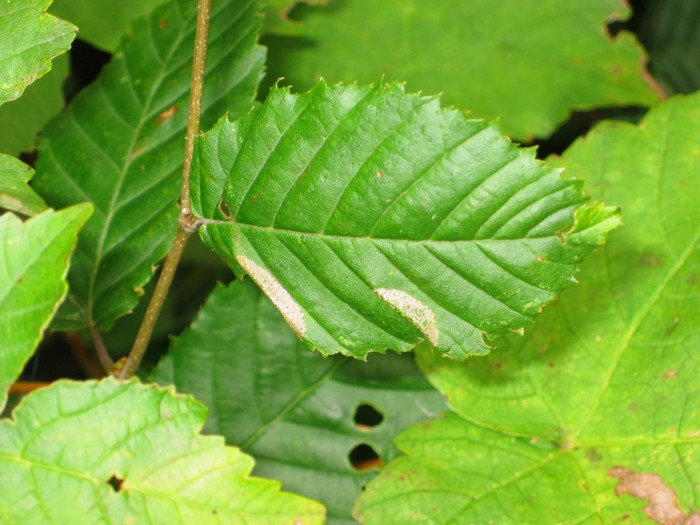
Damage

The wingspan is 6–8 mm. There are two generations per year with adults on wing in May and again from July to August.

The larvae feed on Carpinus betulus and Ostrya carpinifolia. They mine the leaves of their host plant.
