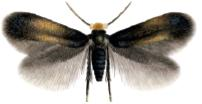

Scientific classification
- Kingdom: Animalia
- Phylum: Arthropoda
- Class: Insecta
- Order: Lepidoptera
- Family: Nepticulidae
- Genus: Stigmella
- Species: S. pyri

Binomial name
- Stigmella pyri (Glitz, 1865)

Synonyms
- Nepticula pyri Glitz, 1865

= Stigmella pyri =

Species of moth

Stigmella pyri is a moth of the family Nepticulidae. It is found from Sweden to the Pyrenees, Italy and Bulgaria, and from Great Britain to Ukraine.

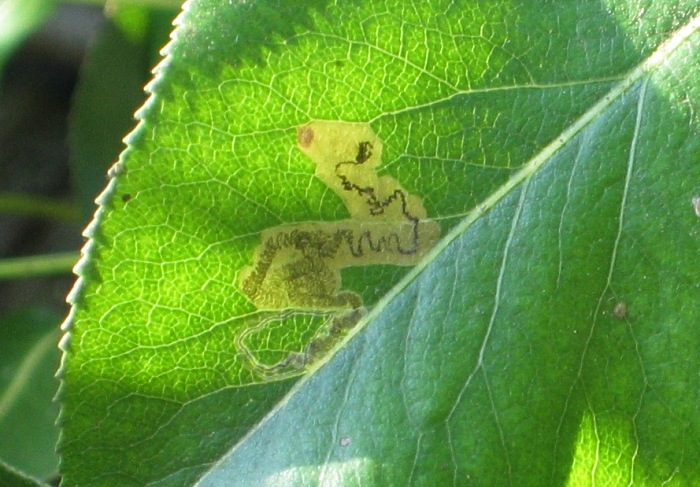
Damage

The wingspan is 4.2-5.2 mm. Adults are on wing from May to June and again in August in two generations.
