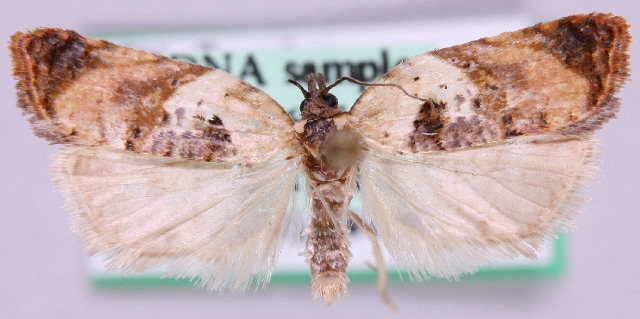

Scientific classification
- Domain: Eukaryota
- Kingdom: Animalia
- Phylum: Arthropoda
- Class: Insecta
- Order: Lepidoptera
- Family: Tortricidae
- Genus: Acleris
- Species: A. permutana

Binomial name
- Acleris permutana (Duponchel, in Godart, 1836)

Synonyms
- Glyphiptera permutana Duponchel, in Godart, 1836; Tortrix (Teras) permutanana Herrich-Schaffer, 1851

= Acleris permutana =

Species of moth

Acleris permutana is a species of moth of the family Tortricidae. It is found in Ireland, Great Britain, Portugal, Spain, France, Belgium, the Netherlands, Germany, Denmark, Sweden, Austria, Italy, the Czech Republic, Slovakia, Slovenia, Croatia, Hungary, Romania, North Macedonia and Russia. The habitat consists of coastal sandhills and limestone.

The wingspan is 15–22 mm. The head is dark brown, thorax whitish-ochreous. The forewings are oblong, reddish-ochreous; basal half before central fascia whitish-ochreous with a few darker strigulae, enclosing a triangular dark reddish -fuscous dorsal spot mixed with leaden-grey, with a scale-tuft in its apex. The central fascia is brown, posteriorly undefined, with small scale tufts on the anterior edge, one in middle larger. The costal patch is reddish-fuscous, connected beneath with termen. The hindwings are whitish-fuscous. Julius von Kennel provides a full description.

Adults are on wing from August to September.

The larvae feed on Rosa species and Prunus spinosa. They feed within the spun shoots and leaves of their host plant. Larvae can be found from June to August.
