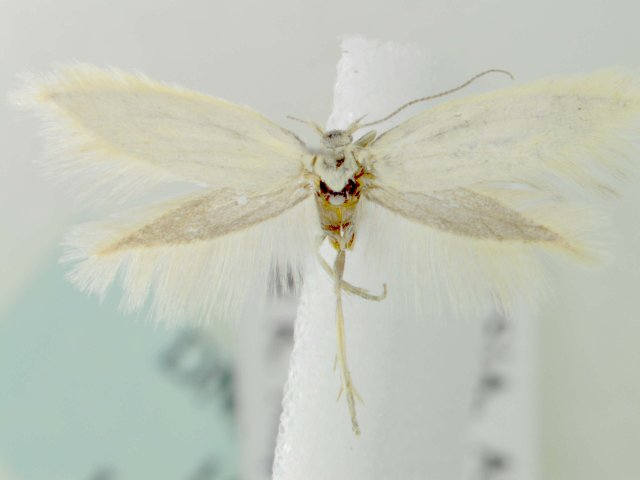

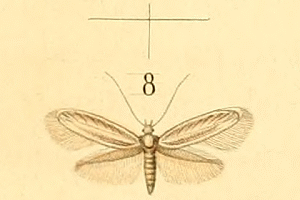

Scientific classification
- Domain: Eukaryota
- Kingdom: Animalia
- Phylum: Arthropoda
- Class: Insecta
- Order: Lepidoptera
- Family: Elachistidae
- Genus: Elachista
- Species: E. pollutella

Binomial name
- Elachista pollutella Duponchel, 1843

= Elachista pollutella =

Species of moth

Elachista pollutella is a moth of the family Elachistidae. It is found from France and Belgium to Ukraine and from Germany to Italy, Hungary and Romania. It has also been recorded from Greece, southern parts of European Russia and the Crimea, Siberian Russia and Mongolia.

The wingspan is 11–13 mm.

The larvae feed on Elymus hispidus. They mine the leaves of their host plant.
