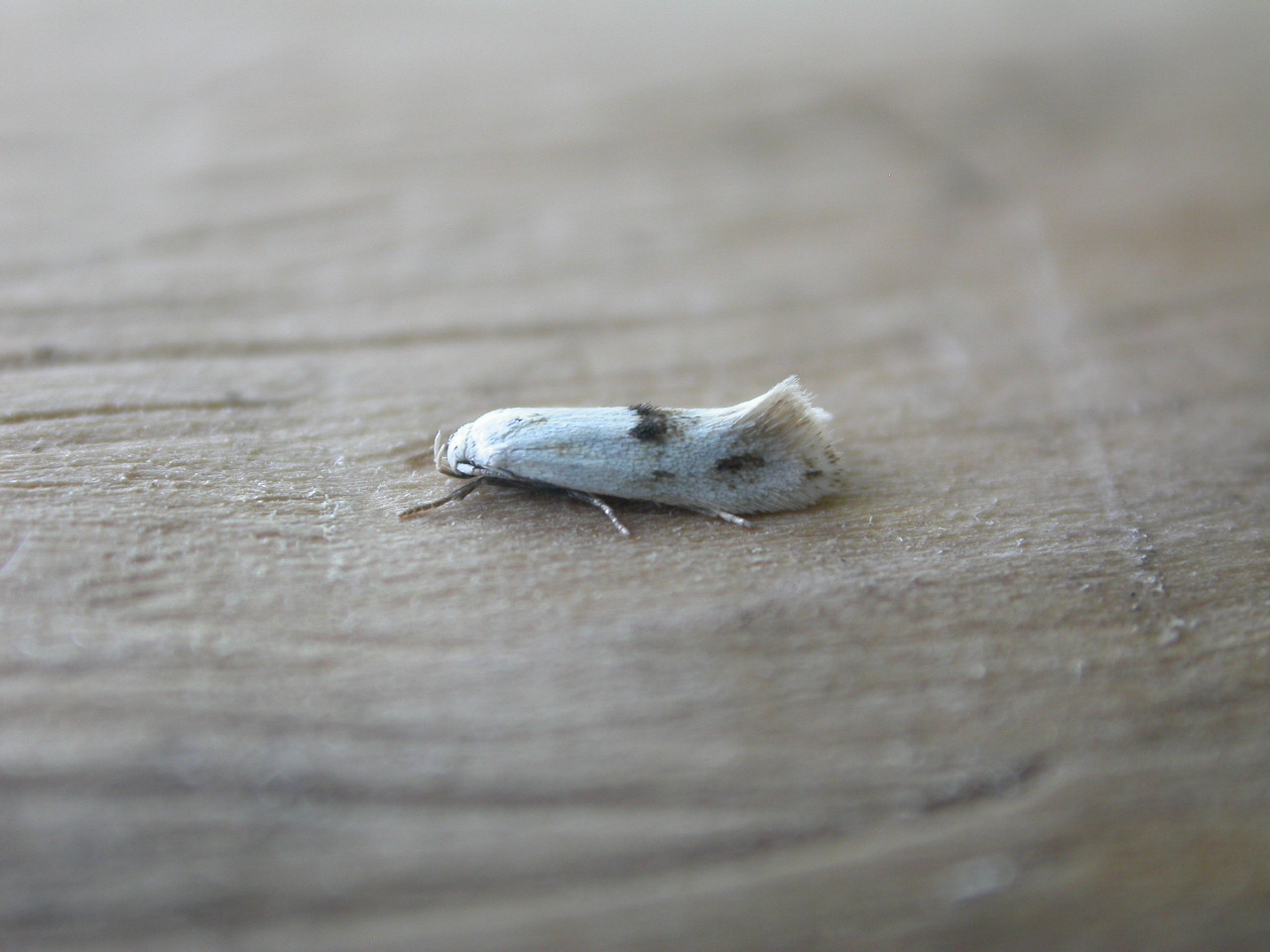

Scientific classification
- Domain: Eukaryota
- Kingdom: Animalia
- Phylum: Arthropoda
- Class: Insecta
- Order: Lepidoptera
- Family: Elachistidae
- Genus: Elachista
- Species: E. maculicerusella

Binomial name
- Elachista maculicerusella (Bruand, 1859)

Synonyms
- Lita maculicerusella Bruand, 1859; Tinea cerusella Hubner, 1796; Elachista monosemiella Rossler, 1881

= Elachista maculicerusella =

Species of moth

Elachista maculicerusella is a moth of the family Elachistidae found in Europe.

The wingspan is 10–12 millimetres (0.39–0.47 in). The moth flies from May to August depending on the location. The head is whitish. Forewings are ochreous- whitish; sometimes two or three dark fuscous spots near base; cloudy dark fuscous fasciae in middle and at 3/4, sometimes obsolete towards costa, anterior including black plical stigma. Hindwings are grey. The larva is pale yellow; head brown; 2 with two faint brown spots.

== Gallery ==
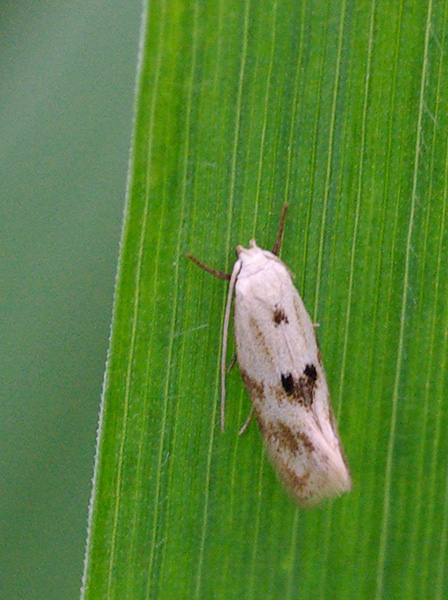

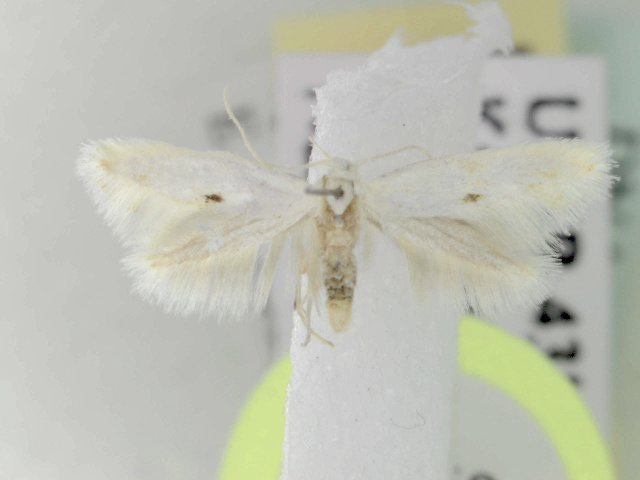

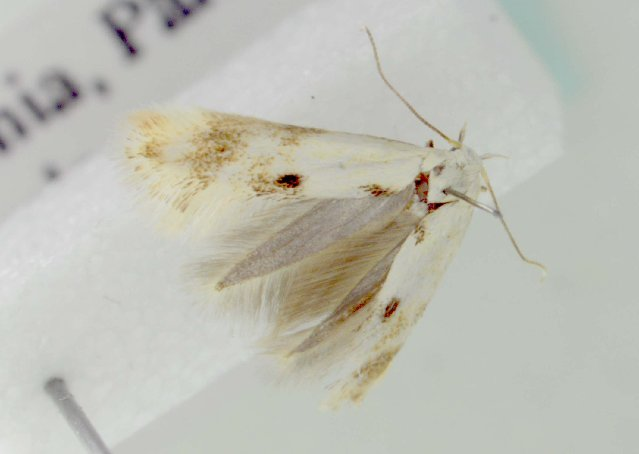

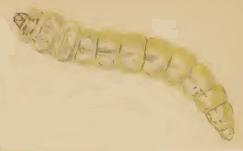
Larva

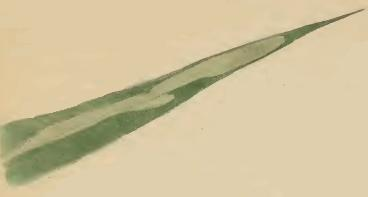
Mined Phragmites leaf
