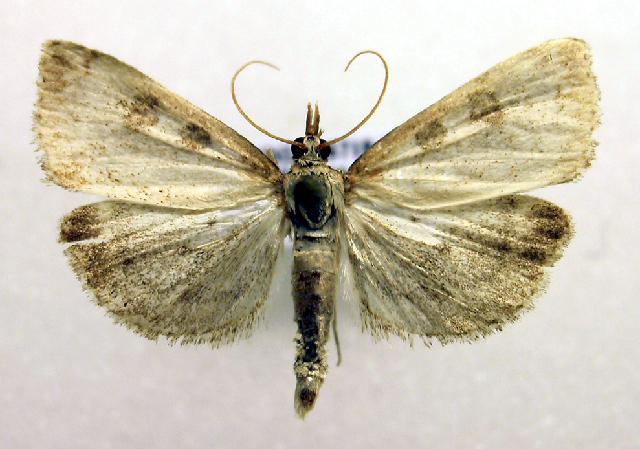

Scientific classification
- Domain: Eukaryota
- Kingdom: Animalia
- Phylum: Arthropoda
- Class: Insecta
- Order: Lepidoptera
- Family: Crambidae
- Genus: Udea
- Species: U. elutalis

Binomial name
- Udea elutalis (Denis & Schiffermüller, 1775)

Synonyms
- Pyralis elutalis Denis & Schiffermüller, 1775; Pyralis albidalis Hübner, 1796

= Udea elutalis =

Species of moth

Udea elutalis is a species of moth in the family Crambidae. The species was first described by Michael Denis and Ignaz Schiffermüller in 1775. It is found in Spain, France, Germany, Switzerland, Austria, Italy, Slovakia, the Czech Republic, Poland, Romania, Estonia, Finland, Russia and Kazakhstan. It is also found in China (Hebei, Xinjiang).

The wingspan is about 23 mm.

The larvae feed on Artemisia vulgaris, Artemisia absinthium, Aegopodium and Senecio species.
