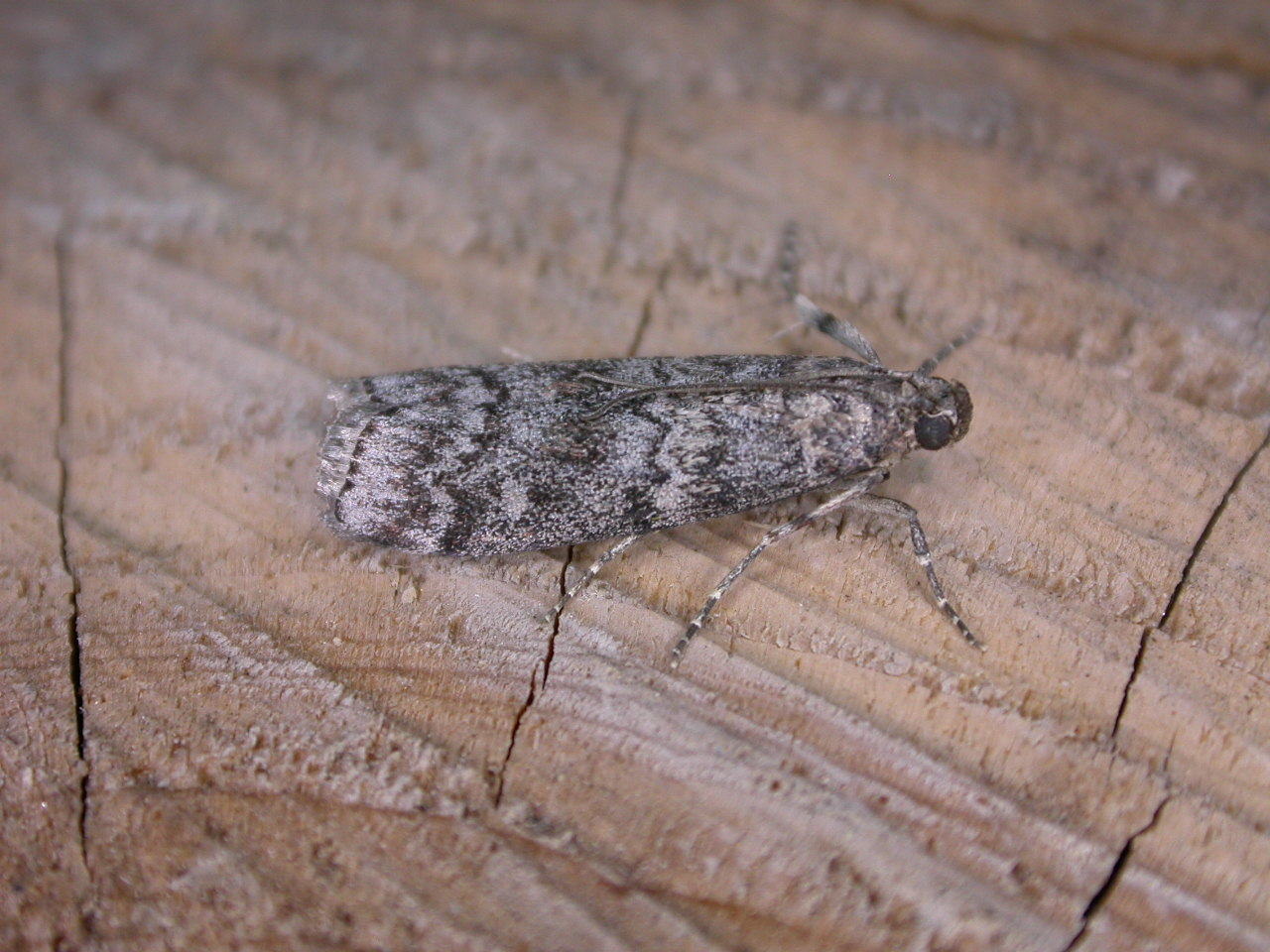

Scientific classification
- Kingdom: Animalia
- Phylum: Arthropoda
- Clade: Pancrustacea
- Class: Insecta
- Order: Lepidoptera
- Family: Pyralidae
- Genus: Dioryctria
- Species: D. simplicella

Binomial name
- Dioryctria simplicella Heinemann, 1863

Synonyms
- Dioryctria mutatella Fuchs, 1903; Dioryctria abietella var. mutatella Fuchs, 1903

= Dioryctria simplicella =

Species of moth

Dioryctria simplicella is a moth of the family Pyralidae. It is known from Europe, except the southern parts.

The wingspan is 21–30 mm. Adults are on wing from July to September in one generation per year.
