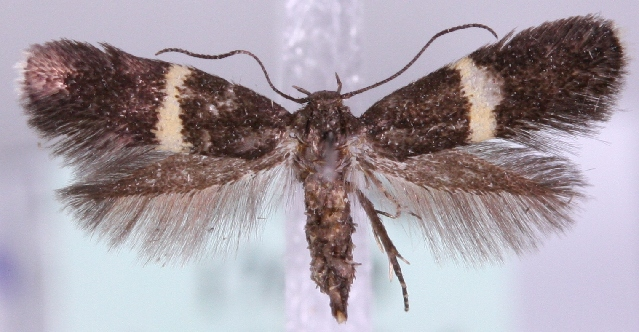

Scientific classification
- Domain: Eukaryota
- Kingdom: Animalia
- Phylum: Arthropoda
- Class: Insecta
- Order: Lepidoptera
- Family: Elachistidae
- Genus: Elachista
- Species: E. unifasciella

Binomial name
- Elachista unifasciella (Haworth, 1828)

Synonyms
- Tinea unifasciella Haworth, 1828

= Elachista unifasciella =

Species of moth

Elachista unifasciella is a moth of the family Elachistidae found in Asia and Europe.

== Description ==
The wingspan is 9–10 millimetres (0.35–0.39 in). Adults are on wing from June to July in one generation per year.

The larvae feed on Avenula pubescens, false-brome (Brachypodium sylvaticum), cock's-foot (Dactylis glomerata), creeping soft grass (Holcus mollis) and wood millet (Milium effusum). They mine the leaves of their host plant.

== Distribution ==
It is found from Sweden to the Pyrenees, Italy and Greece and from Great Britain to Russia and Turkey.
