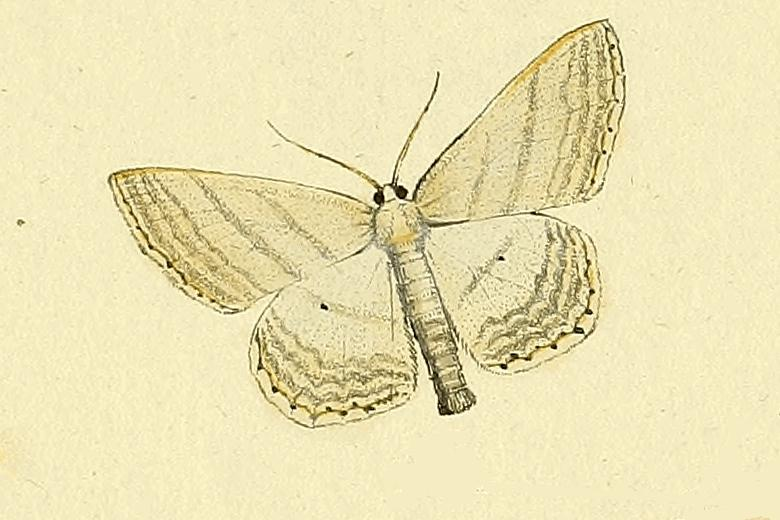

Scientific classification
- Domain: Eukaryota
- Kingdom: Animalia
- Phylum: Arthropoda
- Class: Insecta
- Order: Lepidoptera
- Family: Geometridae
- Genus: Scopula
- Species: S. umbelaria

Binomial name
- Scopula umbelaria (Hübner, [1813])

Synonyms
- Geometra umbelaria Hübner, 1813; Acidalia compararia Herrich-Schäffer, 1847; Phalaena sylvestrata Borkhausen, 1794; Acidalia majoraria Leech, 1897

= Scopula umbelaria =

Species of geometer moth in subfamily Sterrhinae

Scopula umbelaria is a moth of the family Geometridae described by Jacob Hübner in 1813. It is found in the Benelux, France, Italy, Germany, Switzerland, Austria, the Czech Republic, Slovakia, Hungary, Slovenia, former Yugoslavia, Romania, Poland and Russia. In the east, the range extends to the eastern part of the Palearctic realm.

The wingspan is 29–33 mm. Adults are on wing from late May to early July in one generation per year.

The larvae feed on Prunus spinosa, Vincetoxicum hirundinaria, Clematis, Polygonum, Vicia and Solidago species. Larvae can be found from the fall to May. The species overwinters in the larval stage.

== Subspecies ==
- Scopula umbelaria umbelaria
- Scopula umbelaria graeseri Prout, 1935
- Scopula umbelaria majoraria (Leech, 1897)
