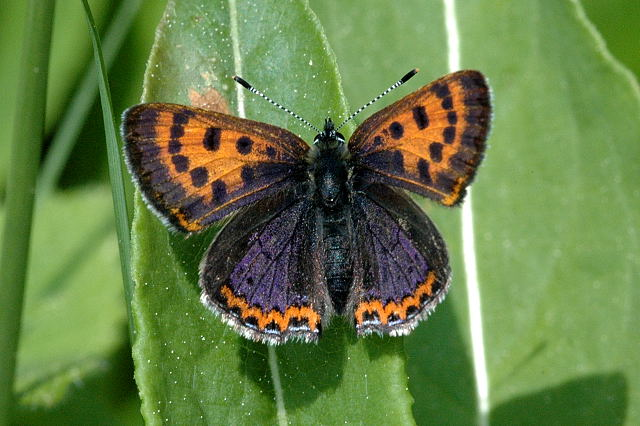
- Male
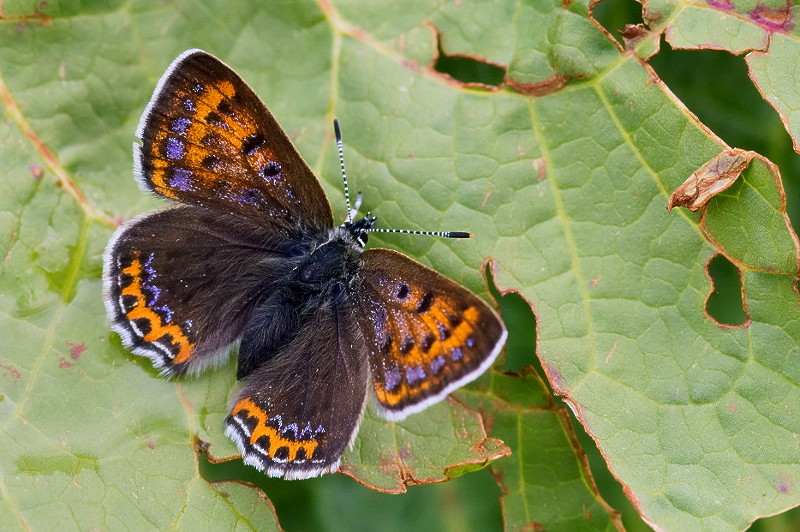
- Female

Scientific classification
- Kingdom: Animalia
- Phylum: Arthropoda
- Class: Insecta
- Order: Lepidoptera
- Family: Lycaenidae
- Genus: Lycaena
- Species: L. helle

Binomial name
- Lycaena helle Denis & Schiffermüller, 1775

= Lycaena helle =

Species of butterfly

Lycaena helle, the violet copper, is a butterfly of the family Lycaenidae. It is found from the Pyrenees to northern Norway and from Belgium east across the Palearctic to Central Asia, Siberia and Amur. The wingspan is 24–26 mm. The butterfly flies from May to July depending on the location.

== Description from Seitz ==
C. amphidamas Esp. (= xanthe Lang, helle Schiff.) (77d). Smaller than the preceding forms, at the most as large as small phlaeas. Upperside dark brown, in the females of the spring brood the disc of the forewing reddish yellow, both wings with a sky-blue gloss, which is especially strong in the sun in live specimens. On the underside there is before the red submarginal band of the hindwing an always distinct bluish white lunate band, which in the female is usually continued on to the forewing and is accompanied by black dots. The summer-form obscura Ruhl (77e) is darker above and more yellow beneath. Otherwise the variability is less than in other Chrysophanus. Specimens from the high North have been separated as lapponica Backhaus, and Wheeler mentions that the gloss is more blue in some districts and more violet in others. — In Central and North Europe, from Belgium, Baden, and Switzerland eastward to Amurland and northward to Scandinavia and Lapland, sporadic and absent from large districts. Egg flattened, white with darker top. Larva rather long, light green with a pale-edged dark dorsal Hne and light yellow side-stripe, in June and autumn on Polygonum bistorta (said to occur also on Rumex). Pupa yellowish brown, with irregular blackish markings, dirty white on the back of the abdomen. The butterflies are on the wing in May and again in July and August in damp meadows, very plentiful at their flight-places. The spring-form is particularly fond of the flowers of Cardamine pratensis. At night the butterflies rest on the underside of the leaves of Alnus and Salix, where sometimes several are found together asleep and can be obtained by beating. In the north the species is found especially in the plains, while in the south of its area it is more plentiful in the mountains, where it occurs up to 6000 ft.

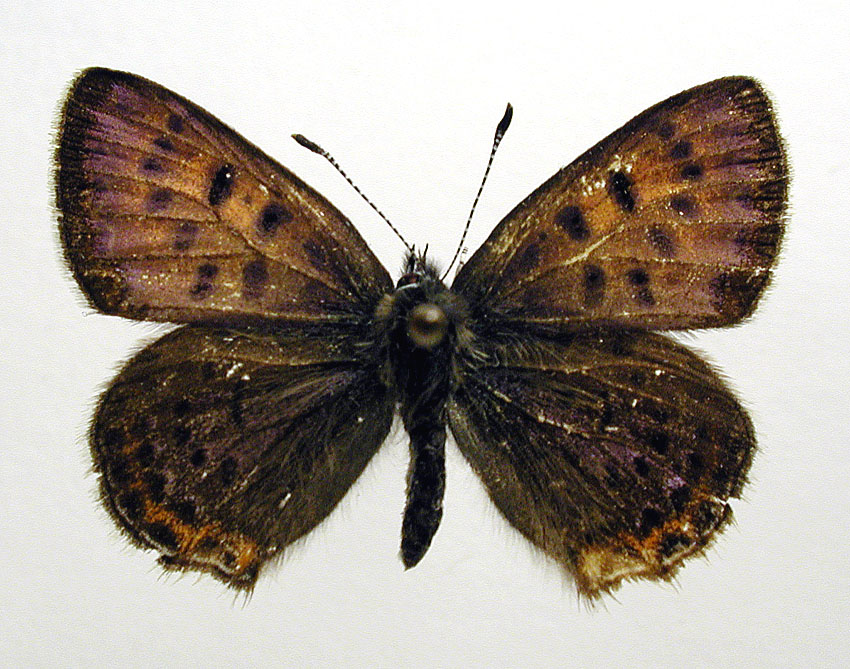
Dorsal view

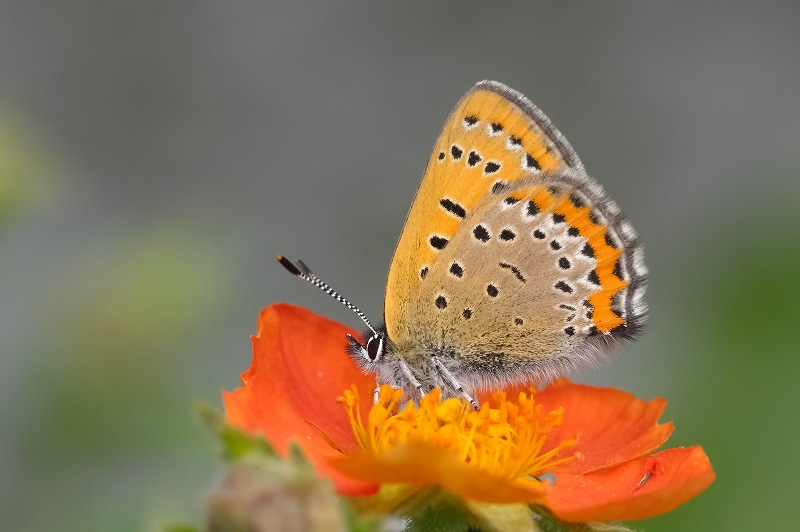
Ventral view

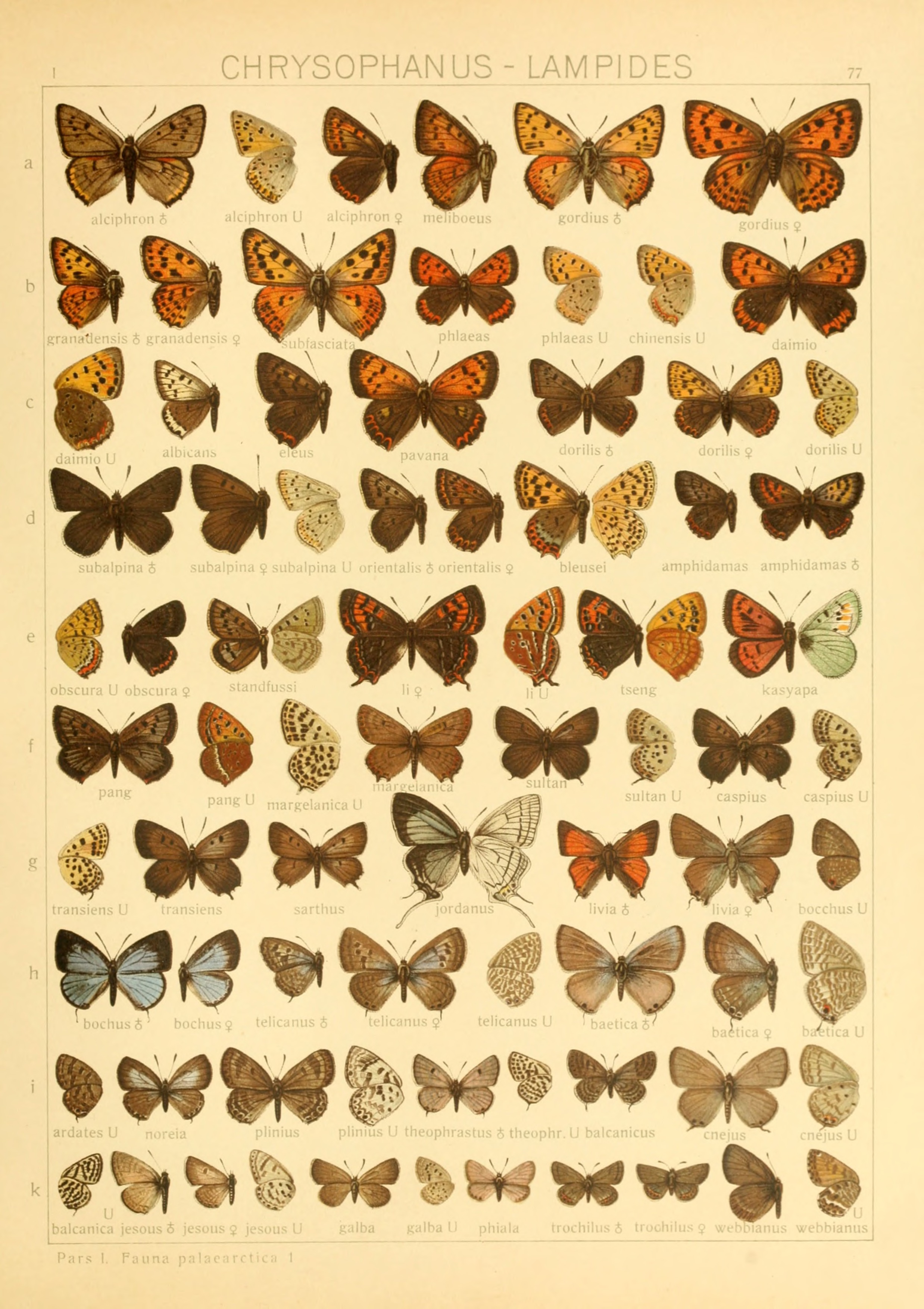
Seitz as amphidamas
