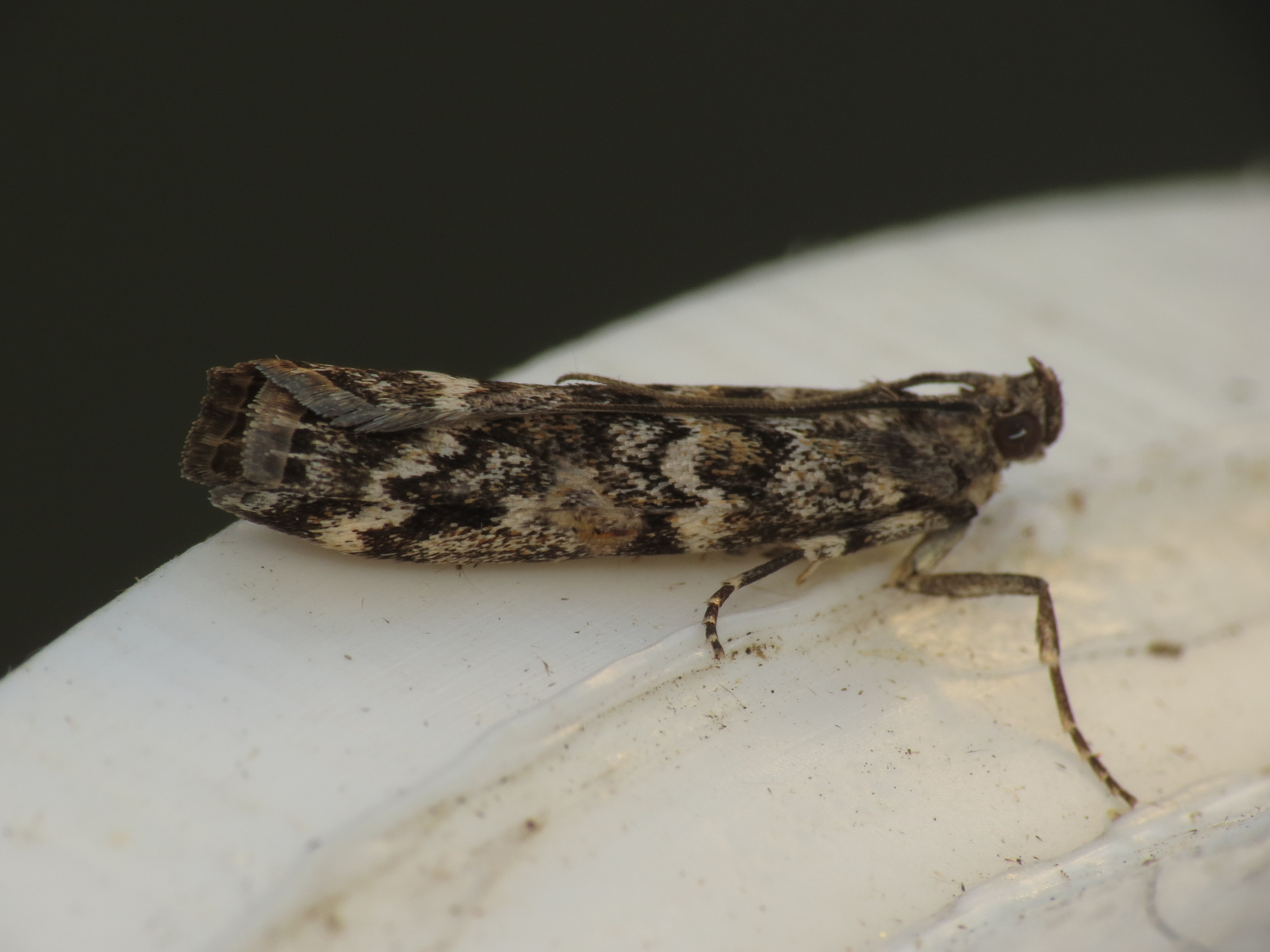

Scientific classification
- Kingdom: Animalia
- Phylum: Arthropoda
- Class: Insecta
- Order: Lepidoptera
- Family: Pyralidae
- Genus: Dioryctria
- Species: D. schuetzeella

Binomial name
- Dioryctria schuetzeella Fuchs, 1899

= Dioryctria schuetzeella =

Species of moth

Dioryctria schuetzeella is a moth of the family Pyralidae. It is found in most of Europe, except the Balkan Peninsula, the Iberian Peninsula, Ireland and Ukraine.

The wingspan is 21–28 mm. The moth flies in one generation from June to August.

The caterpillars feed on Picea abies.
