= Fauna of the Isles of Scilly =

Archipelago in Cornwall

The Isles of Scilly are an archipelago 45 km (28 mi) off Land's End, Cornwall. Little of the fauna on, above or in the seas surrounding the isles was described prior to the 19th century, when birds and fish started to be described. Most records of other animals date from the 20th century onwards.

== Historical overview ==
There are few pre-19th-century records for animals. William Borlase published The Natural History of Cornwall in 1758, commenting on the number of rabbits, and Jonathan Couch's A Cornish Fauna gave an account of some the animals known in mainland Cornwall and the Isles of Scilly. In the 19th century, following the fashion of the time, birds were shot and stuffed, especially by Augustus Smith and his predecessors on Tresco. Egg collecting was allowed and in the Natural History Museum there are, in the collection, forty-five eggs taken between 1880 and 1936 from Annett, even though it was a bird sanctuary. Newspapers recorded some of the fish caught but there was little recording of other groups of animals.

It was in the 20th century when regular accounts can be found for other animal groups following visits from naturalists who often published their observations in the scientific literature. For example, William Bristow visited the islands on three occasions from 1927 to 1934, recording spiders including on some of the uninhabited islands. The Cornwall Bird Watching and Preservation Society published bird reports from the 1930s onwards and the Isles of Scilly Bird Group (founded 2000) took over publishing their own annual reports – Isles of Scilly Bird and Natural History Review – which included other groups of animals such as the diptera.

== Planarian (flatworms) ==
Fourteen species of terrestrial flatworms have been recorded in Britain and Ireland with five found on the Isles of Scilly. Only three or four of the fourteen species are native with two recorded on Tresco.

- The Australian flatworm (Australoplana sanguinea) – a flatworm from Australia and New Zealand and first found on Tresco in 1960. Now found in many parts of Britain. Feeds on earthworms.
- Australopacifica coxii – a flatworm from Australia and found on Tresco in 1975. Feeds on earthworms.
- Kontikia andersoni – found on Tresco in 1984; it is native to Australia and/or New Zealand.
- Microplana terrestris – recorded on Tresco (1982). Native
- Microplana scharffi – recorded on Tresco (1984) and St Mary's (1985). Native

== Opiliones (harvestmen) ==
- Dicranopalpus ramosus
- Leiobunum blackwalli – found on all the inhabited islands, Annet and Great Innisvouls.
- Leiobunum rotundum – recorded on Tean, Tresco and St Martin's.
- Nelima gothica – found on St Mary's and Tresco.
- Nelima silvatica
- Opilio saxatilis
- Phalangium opilio – found on St Martin's, St Mary's, Samson and Tresco.

== Odonata ==
The Atlas of the Dragonflies of Britain and Ireland published in 1996 listed just three species; blue-tailed damselfly, common darter (both breeding residents) and the migrant hawker. The pools can be slightly brackish at times and only species that can tolerate these conditions can establish populations on the islands.

Steve Jones compiled a list which was published in the Cornwall Dragonfly Group Newsletter (numbers 6–8) and the list below is based on that information. In comparison, at that time, Cornwall had 23 breeding species and 28 species recorded.

- Common blue damselfly (Enallagma cyathigerum) – in 1994 an ovipositing female was at Lower Moors, St Mary's.
- Blue-tailed damselfly (Ischnura elegans) – can tolerate brackish conditions and breeds on St Agnes, St Mary's and Tresco.
- Migrant hawker (Aeshna mixta) – increased sightings since the mid-1990s on St Agnes, St Mary's and Tresco.
- Southern hawker (A. cyanea) – recorded on St Mary's in October 1992 and October 1996 and from Tresco also in October 1996.
- Common hawker (A. juncea) – Great Pool, Tresco in October 1992.
- Emperor dragonfly (Anax imperator) – individuals seen on St Mary's, September 1992 and August 1996.
- Green darner (A. junius) – At least two individuals (male and female) were found on St Agnes on 10 September 1998 (just one day after the first record for the Western Palaearctic in Cornwall, the previous day). There was a male on St Mary's during the following week and a female on Tresco on 30 September and the next day.
- Golden-ringed dragonfly (Cordulegaster boltonii) – October 1996 on Tresco.
- Red-veined darter (Sympetrum fonscolombii) – two males on Great Pool, Tresco, May 1992.
- Yellow-winged darter (S. flaveolum) – one seen on St Mary's during the ″Invasion Year″ of 1995.
- Common darter (S. striolatum) – breeding on St Agnes, St Mary's and Tresco.

== Orthopteroid ==
The Orthopteroids have been recorded in Scilly since 1890 and specialists have visited the islands since 1989 to give, what is considered, complete coverage of these insects. The list below is taken from Orthopteroid Insects on Scilly (2001) with additional records referenced.

=== Orthoptera (crickets and grasshoppers) ===
- Oak bush-cricket (Meconema thalassinum) – one seen on Tresco in 1960.
- Great green bush-cricket (Tettigonia viridissima) – resident on St Mary's and Tresco and probably an Allerød pioneer.
- Dark bush-cricket (Pholidoptera griseoaptera) – one seen on Tresco in 1906.
- Grey bush-cricket (Platycleis albopunctata) – resident on Bryher and a probable Allerød pioneer. The numbers in the colony fluctuates.
- Long-winged cone-head (Conocephalus fuscus) – a recent resident, discovered in 1990 on St Martin's and St Mary's, on Gugh and St Agnes in 1994 and Tresco in 1996.
- Short-winged cone-head (Conocephalus dorsalis) – a recent resident, the first confirmed record was from St Agnes in 1992 and found on St Mary's in 1996 on Lower Moors. Three known populations including Lower Moors, St Mary's.
- Speckled bush-cricket (Leptophyes punctatissima) – a recent resident, one was found near the Garrison on St Mary's in 1991. In 2000 a small population was found.
- House cricket (Acheta domestica) – in 1992 found on St Mary's at Porthloo rubbish tip.
- Mole cricket – one found on St Mary's in 1932. The specimen was donated to the Royal Cornwall Museum in Truro and refound by Stella Turk in 1998.
- Common groundhopper (Tetrix undulata) – probably introduced on horticultural material and found in Tresco Abbey Gardens in circa 1960. Since found on Abbey Pool where there is a large population.
- Desert locust (Schistocerca gregaria) – there are records going back to the 19th century and one was found on St Mary's in the autumn of 1988.
- Migratory locust (Locusta migratoria) – one found on St Mary's in October 1998.
- Blue-winged grasshopper (Oedipoda caerulescens) – one recorded in the Victoria County History (1906) in 1903.
- Field grasshopper (Chorthippus brunneus) – a probable Allerød pioneer, resident, widespread and numerous on the Annet, Bryher, Great Arthur, Great Ganilly, Great Ganinick, Gugh, Little Arthur, Little Ganilly, Menawethan, Northwethel, Samson, St Agnes, St Helens, St Martin's, St Mary's, Tean and Tresco.

=== Dictyoptera (cockroaches) ===
- Oriental cockroach (Blatta orientalis) – an established introduction and until the early 20th century was a widespread indoor pest. Still found in some premises on St Martin's, St Mary's and Tresco.
- German cockroach (Blattella germanica)
- Lesser cockroach (Ectobius panzeri)

=== Phasmatodea (stick insects) ===
- Prickly stick insect (Acanthoxyla geisovii)
- Smooth stick insect (Clitarchus hookeri)
- Mediterranean stick insect (Bacillus rossius) – first found on Tresco in 2002.
- Laboratory stick insect (Carausius morosus) – first found on St Mary's in 2007and St Agnes in 2009.

=== Dermaptera (earwigs) ===
- Lesser earwig (Labia minor)
- Common earwig (Forficula auricularia)
- Lesne's earwig (Forficula lesnei)

== Lepidoptera ==
In 1992 Michael Hicks and John Hale began to regularly record the moths on St Agnes using a mercury vapour moth trap, initially in the central part of the island and later also on the coast and Gugh. Previously moths had been recorded by visitors on short stays. Their book recorded 213 species of macro moths, 171 species of micro moths and 28 species of butterflies. The list below is taken from Hicks and Hale (1998) with additional records referenced.

=== Micro moths ===
==== Nepticulidae ====
- Stigmella aurella – a common leaf miner on bramble

==== Psychidae ====
- Psyche casta – the larvae feed on elm (Ulmus sp.)

==== Tineidae ====
- Psychoides filicivora – larvae feed on the sori of ferns, including lanceolate spleenwort (Asplenium obovatum) on Bryher
- Infurcitinea argentimaculella
- Monophis laevigella
- M. crocicapitella
- Tinea pallescentella
- T. trinotella
- Yellow v moth (Oinophila v-flava) – in Britain and Ireland the moth is found usually indoors in, for example, wine cellars and warehouses, where the larva feeds on wine corks and fungus. Larvae were found under the flaking bark of Pittosporum crassifolium by Robert Heckford in 1986 at Old Town Bay, St Mary's.

==== Gracillariidae ====
- Gracillaria syringella
- Aspilapteryx tringipennella
- Calybites phasianipennella – larval cones can be found on common sorrel (Rumex acetosa)
- Phyllonorycter messaniella

==== Sesiidae ====
- Thrift clearwing (Pyropteron muscaeforme) – recorded around the coast on thrift (Armeria arenaria)

==== Choreutidae ====
- Nettle-tap moth (Anthophila fabriciana)
- Tebenna micalis – first Isles of Scilly record from St Agnes on 19 June 1998

==== Glyphipterigidae ====
- Cocksfoot moth (Glyphipterix simpliciella) – also found on Gugh

==== Yponomeutidae ====
- Orchard ermine (Yponomeuta padella)
- Apple ermine (Y. malinellus)
- Spindle ermine (Y. cagnagella) – recorded, on St Agnes, at light in August 1994. The food plant, European spindle (Euonymus europaeus), is not found on the islands.
- Swammerdamia pyrella

==== Plutellidae ====
- Diamond-back moth (Plutella xylostella) – can be abundant and numbers reinforced by migration. When walking among crops can have hundreds flying ahead of each footfall.
- Rhigognostis annulatella – the larva food plant is common scurvygrass (Cochlearia officinalis), a common plant on Scilly.

==== Epermeniidae ====
- Epermenia chaerophyllella – recorded as "not common", the larvae and larval feeding signs are easily found on hogweed (Heracleum sphondylium).
- E. aequidentellus – larvae and larval feeding signs can be found on wild carrot. (Daucus carota).

==== Schreckensteiniidae ====
- Schreckensteinia festaliella

==== Coleophoridae ====
- Coleophora serratella
- C. frischella
- C. deauratella
- C. laricella – the only record for this larch miner is by the bibliographer, Francis Jenkinson on St Agnes before 1894. Larch has not been recorded on the islands.
- C. discordella
- C. argentula – the larvae can be found feeding in a case on the seedheads of Achillea millefolium.
- C. vestianella

==== Elachistidae ====
- Elachista argentella
- E. consortella

==== Oecophoridae ====
- Batia lambdella – one trapped on Gugh on 9 July 1995, the first for the Isles of Scilly.
- Brown house moth (Hofmannophila pseudospretella)
- White-shouldered house moth (Endrosis sarcitrella)
- Esperia sulphurella – frequently seen, on St Agnes, flying around gorse (Ulex europaeus).

==== Depressariidae ====
- Parsnip moth (Depressaria radiella)
- D. badiella
- Agonopterix heracliana
- A. alstromeriana
- A. umbellana
- A. nervosa
- A. yeatiana
- A. rotundella – to light on St Mary's, 13 October 2018

==== Gelechiidae ====
- Monochroa cytisella – the larva forms a gall on bracken (Pteridium aquilinum).
- Teleiopsis diffinis
- Bryotropha desertella
- Mirificarma mulinella
- Scrobipalpa samadensis
- S. ocellatella
- S. costella
- Caryocolum viscariella
- Nothris congressariella – common and widespread on the islands, the larvae feed between spun leaves of balm-leaved figwort (Scrophularia scorodonia) and was first recorded on Tresco in 1957. At that time it was not known from anywhere else in Britain and Ireland. Has since been found on the Channel Islands (1982), near Newquay (1987) and Lundy Island 1995.
- Anarsia spartiella
- Brachmia blandella

==== Autostichidae ====
- Oegoconia caradjai

==== Blastobasidae ====
- Blastobasis adustella (formerly known as B. lignea) – endemic to Australia and introduced to western Europe, possibly via the horticultural trade.

==== Tortricidae ====
- Hysterophora maculosana
- Agapeta hamana
- A. rubigana
- A. francillana
- Eupoecilia angustana
- Cochylis atricapitana
- Pandemis cerasana
- Archips podana
- Syndemis musculana
- Clepsis consimilana
- Light brown apple moth (Epiphyas postvittana)
- Epagoge grotiana – also recorded from Gugh on 9 July 1995.
- Pseudargyrotoza conwagana
- Cnephasia conspersana
- Acleris laterana
- A. sparsana
- A. rhombana
- A. aspersana
- A. variegana
- A. hastiana
- A. emargana
- Celypha cespitana
- Olethreutes lacunana
- Endothenia oblongana
- E. quadrimaculana
- Lobesia littoralis – the larvae feed on the flowerheads and seeds of thrift (Armeria maritima) and first recorded on Annet in 1934.
- Bactra furfurana
- B. lancealana
- B. robustana
- Epinotia nisella
- E. abbreviana
- E. maculana – first record for Scilly and Cornwall from St Agnes on 20 September 1997.
- Crocidosema plebejana
- Rhopobota naevana
- Gypsonoma dealbana
- Epiblema uddmanniana
- E. rosaecolana
- Eucosma campoliliana – one on St Agnes (6 August 1995) the first for the Isles of Scilly.
- E. cana
- Thiodia cirrana
- Spilonota ocellana
- Clavigesta purdeyi
- Rhyacionia buoliana
- Enarmonia formosana
- Cydia succedana
- C. nigricana – one found floating in a water tank, on St Agnes (June 1994) was a new record for the Isles of Scilly.
- Cydia fafiflandana – one trapped on St Agnes (20 July 2001) was a first for the Isles of Scilly.
- C. splendana
- Pammene gallicana
- Pammene aurana
- Dichrorampha petiverella

==== Alucitidae ====
- Alucita hexadactyla

==== Crambidae ====
- Euchromius ocellea – a moth that breeds in Africa and a rare migrant to Britain. The first Isles of Scilly record was on 13 August 1994 on St Agnes.
- Chrysoteuchia culmella
- Crambus lathoniellus – the first Scillonian record was one trapped at St Agnes on 5 August 1994.
- C. perlella
- Agriphila selasella
- A. straminella
- A. tristella – one trapped (St Agnes) on 14 August 1994 was the first for the Isles of Scilly.
- A. inquinatella
- A. geniculea
- Catoptria pinella – the first Isles of Scilly record was on 6 August 1995 on St Agnes.
- Pediasia contaminella
- Platytes cerussella
- Scoparia subfusca – also recorded on Gugh.
- S. pyralella – first record for Scilly was on 19 June 1996 at St Agnes.
- S. ambigualis
- Eudonia lacustrata – first record for Scilly was in August 1996 at St Agnes.
- E. lineola
- E. angustea
- E. mercurella
- Garden pebble (Evergestis forficalis)
- E. extimalis – first recorded in the Isles of Scilly on St Agnes on 6 August 1995.
- Gold triangle (Hypsopygia costalis)
- Orthopygia glaucinalis
- Old world webworm (Hellula undalis) – ten trapped on St Agnes in October 1995 were the first records in the Isles of Scilly for this regular migrant.
- Pyrausta despicata – also recorded on Gugh in 1995.
- Loxostege sticticalis – first recorded in the Isles of Scilly on St Agnes on 18 August 1996.
- Uresiphita gilvata – first recorded in the Isles of Scilly on St Agnes on 18 August 1996.
- Sitochroa palealis – first recorded in the Isles of Scilly on St Agnes on 12 October 2001. A second was trapped in the same field on 20 October 2001.
- European corn-borer (Ostrinia nubilalis)
- Small magpie (Anania hortulata)
- A. coronata
- A. verbascalis – the first for the Isles of Scilly, was recorded on 19 August 1995 at St Agnes.
- Udea prunalis
- Rusty dot pearl (U. ferrugalis) – a common migrant
- Mecyna asinalis
- Rush veneer (Nomophila noctuella) – a common migrant
- Dolicharthria punctalis
- Diasemiopsis ramburialis
- Mother of pearl (Patania ruralis)
- Palpita vitrealis

==== Pyralidae ====
- Gold triangle (Hypsopygia costalis)
- Hypsopygia glaucinalis
- Endotricha flammealis
- Lesser wax moth (Achroia grisella)
- Bee moth (Aphomia sociella)
- Pyla fusca
- Etiella zinckenella – one on 20 July 1996 on St Agnes was the fourth for Britain and the first for the Isles of Scilly. A second was recorded on 19 October 2018, also on St Agnes.
- Pempelia palumbella
- Dioryctria abietella – one on 23 July 1994 on St Agnes was the first for the Isles of Scilly.
- Nephopterix angustella – one on 10 September 1996 on St Agnes was the first for the Isles of Scilly.
- Acrobasis advenella
- Apomyelois bistriatella – one on 5 September 1996 on St Agnes was the first for the Isles of Scilly.
- Thistle ermine (Myelois circumvoluta)
- Ancylosis oblitella
- Homoeosoma nebulella
- H. sinuella
- Phycitodes saxicola
- Ephestia elutella

==== Pterophoridae ====
- White plume moth (Pterophorus pentadactyla)
- Emmelina monodactyla

=== Macro moths ===
- Orange swift (Triodia sylvina)
- Six-spot burnet (Zygaena filipendulae)
- Grass eggar (Lasiocampa trifolii) – scarce resident
- Oak eggar (Lasiocampa quercus) – rare
- Chinese character (Cilix glaucata) – rare vagrant
- Peach blossom (Thyatira batis) – uncommon resident
- Grass emerald (Pseudoterpna pruinata) – common resident
- Common emerald (Hemithea aestivaria) – common
- Blood-vein (Timandra griseata) – rare vagrant?
- Mullein wave (Scopula marginepunctata) – scarce resident
- Least carpet (Idaea rusticata) – one at light (21 July 1996) on St Agnes was a first for the Isles of Scilly.
- Small fan-footed wave (I. biselata)
- Single-dotted wave (I. dimidiata)
- Riband wave (I. aversata)
- Portland ribbon wave (I. degeneraria) – a first for the Isles of Scilly when recorded on St Agnes at light on 17 August 1996.
- Vestal (Rhodometra sacraria) – a scarce migrant
- Gem (Orthonama obstipata) – a scarce migrant and possible breeding resident
- Flame carpet (Xanthorhoe designata) – fairly common throughout Britain; the first two Scillonian records were found on 18 August 2000 (St Mary's) and a second on 2 September 2000 (St Agnes).
- Red twin-spot carpet (X. spadicearia)
- Dark-barred twin-spot carpet (X. ferrugata)
- Garden carpet (X. fluctuata)
- Lead belle (Scotopteryx mucronata)
- Common carpet (Epirrhoe alternata) – also recorded on Gugh
- Yellow shell (Camptogramma bilineata)
- Purble bar (Cosmorhoe ocellata) – also recorded on Gugh
- Small phoenix (Ecliptopera silaceata) – 6 August 1995 was the first record for the Isles of Scilly on St Agnes.
- Barred straw (Gandaritis pyraliata) – first Scillonian record on 23 July 2000 at St Agnes.
- Red-green carpet (Chloroclysta siterata)
- Common marbled carpet (C. truncata)
- Dark marbled carpet (Dysstroma citrata)
- Blue-bordered carpet (Plemyria rubiginata)
- Grey pine carpet (Thera obeliscata)
- Green carpet (Colostygia pectinataria)
- July highflyer (Hydriomena furcata)
- Rivulet (Perizoma affinitata)
- Sandy carpet (Perizoma flavofasciata)
- Foxglove pug (Eupithecia pulchellata)
- Lime-speck pug (E. centaureata)
- Wormwood pug (E. absinthiata)
- Common pug (E. vulgata)
- Grey pug (E. subfuscata)
- Narrow-winged pug (Eupithecia nanata) – rare
- Cypress pug (Eupithecia phoeniceata) – rare
- Green pug (Chloroclystis rectangulata) – common
- Double-striped pug (Gymnoscelis rufifasciata) – common
- Yellow-barred brindle (Acasis viretata) – rare
- Magpie moth (Abraxas grossulariata) – common
- Clouded border (Lomaspilis marginata) – rare/vagrant?
- Sharp-angled peacock (Macaria alternata) rare vagrant
- Latticed heath (Semiothisa clathrata) – rare vagrant
- Brimstone moth (Opisthograptis luteolata) – common
- Bordered beauty (Epione repandaria) – first Scillonian record on St Mary's (5 September 1986) and the second record (29 August 2000).
- Early thorn (Selenia dentaria) – common
- Scalloped hazel (Odontopera bidentata) – common
- Scalloped oak (Crocallis elinguaria) – common
- Swallow-tailed moth (Ourapteryx sambucaria) – common
- Feathered thorn (Colotis pennaria) – vagrant?
- Peppered moth (Biston betularia) – uncommon
- Willow beauty (Peribatodes rhomboidaria) – common
- Brussels lace (Cleorodes lichenaria) – scarce
- Common wave (Cabera exanthemata) – rare vagrant?
- Light emerald (Campaea margaritata) – rare vagrant?
- Barred red (Hylaea fasciaria) – scarce resident
- Yellow belle (Aspitates ochrearia) – rare
- Convolvulus hawk-moth (Agrius convolvuli) – scarce
- Death's-head hawk-moth (Acherontia atropos) – rare
- Eyed hawk-moth (Smerinthus ocellata) – rare vagrant
- Hummingbird hawk-moth (Macroglossum stellatarum) – common in some years
- Spurge hawk-moth (Hyles euphorbiae) – the first confirmed record was photographed by David Hunt, in 1972, at Tresco Abbey Gardens and thought to have arrived on imported plants. Henry Harpur-Crewe visited in 1877 and "described it to the gamekeeper, who is a very observant man, and he said he was almost sure he had seen it".
- Bedstraw hawk-moth (Hyles gallii) – first Scillonian record on Tresco (27 July 1945).
- Striped hawk-moth (Hyles livornica) – rare vagrant
- Puss moth (Cerura vinula) – rare
- Pebble prominent (Notodonta ziczac) – rare
- Pale prominent (Pterostoma palpina) – rare
- Brown-tail (Euproctis chrysorrhoea) – rare vagrant
- Yellow-tail (E. similis) – common
- Black arches (Lymantria monacha) – rare vagrant
- Red-necked footman (Atolmis rubricollis) – uncommon
- Four-dotted footman (Cybosia mesomella) – rare vagrant?
- Dingy footman (Collita griseola) – scarce
- Hoary footman (Eilema caniola) – first Scillonian record on Tresco (16 September 1974), second on St Mary's (5 September 1986) and the third on 18 August 2000.
- Scarce footman (Manulea complana) – uncommon
- Buff footman (Eilema depressa) – first Scillonian record on St Agnes (12 October 2001).
- Common footman (Manulea lurideola) – uncommon
- Four-spotted footman (Lithosia quadra) – uncommon migrant
- Crimson speckled (Utetheisa pulchella) – rare vagrant
- Garden tiger (Arctia caja)
- White ermine (Spilosoma lubricipeda) – abundant
- Buff ermine (S. luteum) – abundant
- Muslin moth (Diaphora mendica) – a male on 11 May 1993 on St Agnes, was a new record for the Isles of Scilly.
- Ruby tiger (Phragmatobia fuliginosa) – common
- Cinnabar (Tyria jacobaeae) – common
- Kent black arches (Meganola albula) – uncommon
- Least black arches (Nola confusalis) – scarce
- Square-spot dart (Euxoa obelisca)
- White-line dart (E. tritici) – uncommon
- Turnip moth (Agrotis segetum) – common and abundant
- Heart and dart (A. exclamationis) – abundant
- Crescent dart (A. trux) – common
- Dark sword-grass (A. ipsilon) – abundant
- Shuttle-shaped dart (A. puta ssp. insula) – abundant, bright and colourful compared with the mainland race.
- Sand dart (A. ripae) – rare
- Great dart (A. bigramma) – rare immigrant, three were caught on 10 August 1997 during a period of migrant activity. The first Scillonian record was one caught on St Mary's by B Elliot (24 August 1995).
- The flame (Axylia putris) – abundant
- Flame shoulder (Ochropleura plecta) – abundant
- Radford's flame shoulder (Ochropleura leucogaster) – rare vagrant. The individuals caught on St Agnes (30 October and 21 November 1997), were the 6th and 7th British records and a new record for the Isles of Scilly.
- Large yellow underwing (Noctua pronuba) – abundant
- Lesser yellow underwing (N. comes) – common, about half of specimens are ab. sagittifer Cockane.
- Broad-bordered yellow underwing (N. fimbriata) – rare, one on 29 September 1994 was a new Isles of Scilly record. A second was caught on 29 September 1995 and a third on 9 July 2001; all on St Agnes.
- Lesser broad-bordered yellow underwing (N. janthe) – common
- Least yellow underwing (N. interjecta caliginosa) – rare, one on St Agnes (12 August 1994) was the first Scillonian record since the 1880s.
- True lover's knot (Lycophotia porphyrea) – common
- Pearly underwing (Peridroma saucia) – common
- Ingrailed clay (Diarsia mendica mendica) – common
- Small square-spot (D. rubi) – common
- Setaceous Hebrew character (Xestia c-nigrum) – common
- Square-spot rustic (X. xanthographa) – abundant
- Nutmeg (Anarta trifolil) – abundant
- Shears (Hada plebeja) – abundant
- Cabbage moth (Mamestra brassicae) – common
- Dot moth (Melanchra persicariae) – rare vagrant
- Bright-line brown-eye (Lacanobia oleracea) – abundant
- Broom moth (Ceramica pisi) – common
- Broad-barred white (Hecatera bicolorata) – common
- Campion (Sideridis rivularis) – rare, one on St Agnes (25 July 1994) was the first for the Isles of Scilly.
- Marbled coronet (Hadena confusa) – uncommon
- Lychnis (Hadena bicruris) – uncommon
- Hedge rustic (Tholera cespitis) – rare vagrant
- Common Quaker (Orthosia cerasi) – common
- Hebrew character (O. gothica) – abundant
- Clay (Mythimna ferrago) – rare vagrant
- White-point (Mythimna albipuncta) – rare
- Delicate (M. vitellina) – common
- Smoky wainscot (M. impura) – abundant (often with a light brown wedge-shaped area in the hindwing)
- Common wainscot (M. pallens) – common
- Shore wainscot (M. litoralis) – uncommon
- L-album wainscot (Mythimna l-album) – scarce
- White-speck (M. unipuncta) – common
- Shoulder-striped wainscot (Leucania comma) – rare, one on St Agnes (25 June 1995) was the first for the Isles of Scilly.
- Cosmopolitan (Leucania loreyi) – rare
- Chamomile shark (Cucullia chamomillae) – uncommon
- The shark (Cucullia umbratica) – uncommon
- The mullein (Cucullia verbasci) – rare
- Feathered brindle (Aporophyla australis) – rare/vagrant, one on St Agnes (11 October 1994) was a new record for the Isles of Scilly.
- Black rustic (Aporophyla nigra) – abundant
- Brindled green (Dryobotodes eremita) – rare/vagrant
- Black-banded (Polymixis xanthomista) – rare/vagrant
- Feathered ranunculus (Polymixis lichenea) ssp. scillonea – abundant; the subspecies is darker than those on the mainland.
- Satellite (Eupsilia transversa) – rare, one on sugar at St Agnes (5 November 1993) was a new record for the Isles of Scilly.
- Brick (Agrochola circellaris) – rare
- Red-line quaker (Agrochola lota) – rare
- Yellow-line quaker (Agrochola macilenta) – rare/vagrant, one on St Agnes (29 October 1997) was a new record for the Isles of Scilly.
- Lunar underwing (Omphaloscelis lunosa) – abundant
- Pink-barred sallow (Xanthia togata) – rare/vagrant
- The sallow (X. icteritia) – rare/vagrant
- Grey dagger (Acronicta psi) – rare
- Knot grass (A. rumicis) – abundant
- Marbled green (Cryphia muralis) – common
- Mouse moth (Amphipyra tragopoginis) – rare
- Staw underwing (Thalpophila matura) – rare
- Small angle shades (Euplexia lucipara) – common
- Angle shades (Phlogophora meticulosa) – abundant
- Dun-bar (Cosmia trapezina) – rare/vagrant
- Dark arches (Apamea monoglypha) – abundant
- Clouded-bordered brindle (A. crenata) – scarce
- Dusky brocade (A. remissa) abundant
- Marbled minor (Oligia strigilis) – abundant
- Middle-barred minor (O. fasciuncula) – rare
- Cloaked minor (Mesoligia furuncula) – uncommon
- Rosy minor (Mesoligia literosa) – rare/vagrant
- Common rustic (Mesapamea secalis) – abundant
- Small wainscot (Denticucullus pygmina) – rare
- Flounced rustic (Luperina testacea) – abundant
- Saltern ear (Amphipoea fucosa) and/or ear moth (Amphipoea oculea) – these species are difficult to separate without dissection.
- Rosy rustic (Hydraecia micacea) – common
- Frosted orange (Gortyna flavago) – recorded by Richardson on 18 September 1959.
- The crescent (Celaena leucostigma) – scarce
- Twin-spotted wainscot (Archanara geminipuncta) – scarce, the first for the Isles of Scilly was recorded on St Agnes on 5 July 1992.
- Brown-veined wainscot (A. dissoluta) – the first Scillonian specimen was caught on 5 August 1995 and the second on 25 July 2001; both on St Agnes.
- Webb's wainscot (Capsula sparganii) – rare
- Large wainscot (Rhizedra lutosa) – rare
- Treble lines (Charanyca trigrammica) – rare/vagrant, one on St Agnes (28 May 1998) was a first for the Isles of Scilly.
- Rustic (Hoplodrina blanda) – abundant
- Vine's rustic (Hoplodrina ambigua) – abundant
- Small mottled willow (Spodoptera exigua) – common/rare depending on migration
- Mottled rustic (Caradrina morpheus) – common
- Pale mottled rustic (Paradrina clavipalpis) – common
- Porter's rustic (Athetis hospes) – rare, one caught on St Agnes (14 September 1993) was the first for the Isles of Scilly and the second for the UK.
- Bordered sallow (Pyrrhia umbra) – rare, individuals on St Agnes (2 July 1995 and 6 July 1996) was a new Isles of Scilly record.
- Scarce bordered straw (Helicoverpa armigera) – rare
- Bordered straw (Heliothis peltigera) – rare depending on migration
- Purple marbled (Eublemma ostrina) – rare, a new Isles of Scilly record when it was first recorded on St Agnes 10 October 1995.
- Small marbled (Eublemma parva) – rare
- Marble white spot (Protodeltote pygarga) – rare, one on St Agnes (1 July 1994) a first for the Isles of Scilly.
- Pale shoulder (Acontia lucida) – rare, one on St Agnes (10 August 1995 was a new Isles of Scilly record and the third British record for the 20th century.
- Oak nycteoline (Nycteola revayana) – rare, several bred from holm oak (Quercus ilex) at Tresco Abbey Gardens in 1974.
- Scar bank gem (Ctenoplusia limbirena) – rare, one on St Agnes (13 September 1997) was a first for the Isles of Scilly and the thirteenth British record.
- Ni moth (Trichoplusia ni) – rare
- Slender burnished brass (Thysanoplusia orichalcea) – rare
- Burnished brass (Diachrysia chrysitis) – common
- Gold spot (Plusia festucae) – rare
- Silver Y (Autographa gamma) – abundant, depending on migration
- Plain golden Y (Autographa jota) – rare, one trapped on Gugh (9 July 1995) was a first for the Isles of Scilly.
- Dark spectacle (Abrostola triplasia) – common
- Spectacle (Abrostola tripartita) – rare, individuals trapped on Gugh (6 July and 9 July 1995).
- Red underwing (Catocala nupta) – rare
- Herald (Scoliopteryx libatrix) – rare
- Straw dot (Rivula sericealis) – rare
- Snout (Hypena proboscidalis) – common
- Bloxworth snout (Hypena obsitalis) – rare vagrant
- Pinion-streaked snout (Schrankia costaestrigalis) – rare
- Fan-foot (Zanclognatha tarsipennalis) – rare
- Small fan-foot (Herminia grisealis) – rare vagrant
- Bird's wing (Dypterygia scabriuscula) – the first for the Isles of Scilly was one caught on St Agnes on 19 August 2001.
- Dog's tooth (Lacanobia suasa) – first Scillonian record on 19 June 2000 at St Agnes.
- Pale pinion (Lithophane hepatica) – the first Scillonian record was one on St Mary's 27 May 1974 and the second on St Agnes 8 April 2000.
- Porter's rustic (Athetis hospes) – first recorded in the UK at Kynance Cove, Cornwall the second, third, and fourth UK records were all from the same St Agnes field; 14 September 1993, 31 August 1998 and 5 September 2000. A fifth UK record was caught on 11 October 2001.

==== Possible species ====
- Small white-line dart (Euxoa crypta) – A small sample of an Euxoa species was collected in 1993 and sent to David Agassiz for genitalia dissection, which confirmed that the small white-line dart probably occurred on St Agnes. It remains a 'possible' because of identification problems.

=== Butterflies ===
A Cornwall Butterfly Atlas published in 2003 listed 26 species of butterflies recorded on the islands. Eleven are resident or likely to be resident.

- Pale clouded yellow (Colias hyale) – seen in 1900 when it was said to be common and also one in 1968. The ab. helice of clouded yellow can be mistaken for this species so identification from individuals seen in flight are unreliable.
- Berger's clouded yellow (C. alfacariensis) – been reported but unconfirmed.
- Clouded yellow (C. croceus) –
- Brimstone (Gonepteryx rhamni) – A total of six brimstone have been recorded. Three seen in August 1911, on an unnamed island. A male seen on St Agnes on 15 September 1977 and another male flying on Peninnis Head, St Mary's on 24 April 1984. The last seen was on St Martins on 27 September 2013.
- Large white (Pieris brassicae) – resident
- Small white ( P. rapae) – resident
- Green-veined white (P. napi) – resident on St Mary's. First recorded in 1877 on St Mary's and Abbey Gardens, Tresco by the Reverend Harpur Crewe. First recorded on St Agnes in 1992.
- Bath white (Pontia daplidice)
- Orange-tip (Anthocharis cardamines)
- Small copper (Lycaena phlaeas) – resident
- Long-tailed blue (Lampides boeticus)
- Common blue (Polyommatus icarus) – resident
- Holly blue (Celastrina argiolus) – resident
- Red admiral (Vanessa atalanta) – migrant and may overwinter in favourable years.
- Painted lady (V. cardui) – migrant and may overwinter in favourable years.
- American painted lady (V. virginiensis) – one reported on St Agnes on 10 September 1998 and another in 1999.
- Small tortoiseshell (Aglais urticae) – resident
- Large tortoiseshell (Nymphalis polychloros)
- Camberwell beauty (N. antiopa)
- Peacock (Aglais io) – resident but rare on St Agnes.
- Queen of Spain fritillary (Issoria lathonia)
- Speckled wood (Pararge aegeria) – resident, recorded on Tresco in 1903 but did not colonise the islands until the late 1960s.
- Wall (Lasiommata megera)
- Gatekeeper (Pyronia tithonus)
- Meadow brown (Maniola jurtina) – resident
- Ringlet (Aphantopus hyperantus) – resident on St Martin's
- Small heath (Coenonympha pamphilus)
- Monarch (Danaus plexippus)

Species list is taken from A Cornwall Butterfly Atlas with additional information referenced on the species account.

== Hymenoptera ==
=== Ants ===
Fourteen species of ants have been recorded and ten are currently found.

- Myrmica scabrinodis
- Myrmica ruginodis
- Myrmica sabuleti
- Tetramorium caespitum
- Formica fusca
- Red-barbed ant (Formica rufibarbis) – known locally as the St Martin's ant. Only found in the Isles of Scilly and Chobham Common, Surrey. where it is close to extinction. In the June 2007 the Zoological Society of London (ZSL) found over 40 nests on Chapel Down, St Martin's and also nests on some of the Eastern Isles. The ZSL collected 34 queens for a captive rearing programme with the aim of releasing at least 40 captive-reared nests, yearly, into the wild at Chobham.
- Garden black ant (Lasius niger)
- Lasius psammophillius
- Yellow meadow ant (Lasius flavus)
- Lasius fuliginosus – discovered at Pelistry, St Mary's

== Coleoptera (beetles) ==
In 1931 Kenneth Blair published a list of over 500 beetles, collated from collections and published papers. Below is listed some of the species a visitor is likely to see on a visit.

- Bloody-nosed beetle (Timarcha tenebricosa)
- Devil's coach-house (Ocypus olens)
- Green tiger beetle (Cicindela campestris)
- Minotaur beetle (Typhaeus typhoeus)
- Oil beetle (Meloe proscarabaeus)
- Rose chafer (Cetonia aurata)
- Wharf beetle (Nacerdes melanura) – a wood-boring beetle found in timber and boats.
- Carabus problematicus – a violet ground beetle
- Carabus violaceus – a violet ground beetle
- Geotrupes spiniger – a dor beetle and known as "dumbledors" on Scilly.
- Geotrupes stercorarius – a dor beetle
- Rhagonycha fulva – often found on the flowers of wild carrot (Daucus carota), hogweed (Heracleum sphondylium) and other umbellifers.

== Amphibians ==
The common frog (Rana temporaria) is known from Tresco and Higher Moor, Lower Moor and Porthloo on St Mary's. Bones were identified from a 10th- to 13th-century site at Lower Town, St Martins. Giant, albino tadpoles, suffering from a mineral deficiency, resulting in a form of gigantism were found in the pool on the cricket pitch, also on St Martin's. Bones of a toad were found from a 17th-century occupation site at Steval Point Battery, St Mary's.

== Birds ==
As of September 2015 the number of species of birds' recorded is 437, with two, Moltoni's warbler (Sylvia subalpina) (2014) and cedar waxwing (Bombycilla cedrorum) (2015), awaiting confirmation from the British Ornithologists' Union Records Committee.

- Roseate tern (Sterna dougallii) – last bred in 1994
- Spectacled warbler (Sylvia conspicillata) – first Scillonian record on 15 October 2000 on Tresco
- Eurasian bullfinch ((Pyrrhula pyrrhula)) – bred on Tresco in the late 1970s and early 1980s

=== Introductions ===
- Golden pheasant (Chrysolophus pictus) – introduced to Tresco in the 1970s, the population was reduced to one male in the 1980s before further releases.

== Reptiles ==
Slowworms (Anguis fragilis) have been present around Great Popplestone Bay on Bryher since the 1960s.

== Fish ==
- Atlantic salmon (Salmo salar) – a 33 pounds (15 kg) specimen was caught by John Pentreath of Mousehole and purchased by T. A. Dorrien-Smith in May 1880.

== Mammals ==
The Mammals of Cornwall and the Isles of Scilly, an atlas published by the Cornwall Mammal Group lists 56 species for Cornwall and the Isles of Scilly, but most of the mammals found in Cornwall are missing from the islands. These include European badger (Meles meles), red fox (Vulpes vulpes), stoat (Mustela erminea), weasel (Mustela nivalis) and most other small mammals such as the voles.

- House mouse (Mus musculus)
- Brown rat (Rattus norvegicus) – until recently found on all the islands. English Nature started a rat extermination programme in the 1990s which was continued by the Isles of Scilly Wildlife Trust and rats were eradicated from Annet, Menawethan and Samson. The Isles of Scilly Seabird Recovery Project set up in 2013 has now eradicated rats from St Agnes and Gugh
- European rabbit (Oryctolagus cuniculus) – Known to have been on the islands in 1176 and recorded from Tresco in the 1470s. Both John Leland and William Borlase both commented on the large populations. On all the main islands, except Bryher, and also on some of the uninhabited including Annet and Great Ganilly.
- European hedgehog (Erinaceus europaeus) – Introduced to St Mary's in the 1980s they now present a threat to ground-nesting birds, beetles and shrews.
- Lesser white-toothed shrew (Crocidura suaveolens) – In July 1924 W N Blair found an unknown species of shrew on Gugh and sent it to the mammal expert, Martin Hinton, at the British Museum. This specimen, held at the museum, is the type for the species. Ten years earlier H N Robinson found an unknown rodent at Old Town, St Mary's and sent it to Mr F W Smalley "who had the largest collection of rodents in the country".
- Whiskered bat (Myotis mystacinusor) or Brandt's bat (Myotis brandtii) – recorded on Tresco by Cornwall Bat Group in 1997.
- Common noctule (Nyctalus noctula) – recorded on St Mary's in 2000.
- Common pipistrelle (Pipistrellus pipistrellus) – recorded on Bryher, St Mary's and Tresco by Cornwall Bat Group in 1997 and Tresco has at least one roost in 2000.
- Brown long-eared bat (Plecotus auritus) or grey long-eared bat (Plecotus austriacus) – seen in the late 1950s/early 1960s.
- Grey seal (Halichoerus grypus)
- Common seal (Phoca vitulina) – recorded occasionally and sometimes seen in the company of grey seal.
- Humpback whale (Megaptera novaeangliae)
- Common minke whale (Balaenoptera acutorostrata)
- Fin whale (Balaenoptera physalus)
- Harbour porpoise (Phocoena phocoena) – seen on a daily basis until the 1950s and still seen in calm weather, but no longer as frequently as in the past.
- Common bottlenose dolphin (Tursiops truncatus) – there has been a resident group in Cornish/Devon waters since 1991.
- Striped dolphin (Stenella coeruleoalba) – sightings infrequent and one was washed up on Porthlow beach 20 February 2000. (The main bycatch in the tuna drift nets in the Atlantic Ocean).
- Short-beaked common dolphin (Delphinus delphis) – prefer deep water and occasionally seen off Scilly. In mid-October 2000, 200 seen off Peninnis Head.
- Long-finned pilot whale (Globicephala melas)
- Risso's dolphin (Grampus griseus)
- Killer whale (Orcinus orca)

(The species are listed in the order used by Harris and Yalden (2008) Mammals of the British Isles Handbook)

== See also ==
- Formica rufibarbis – Species of ant
- Lesser white-toothed shrew – Species of mammal
