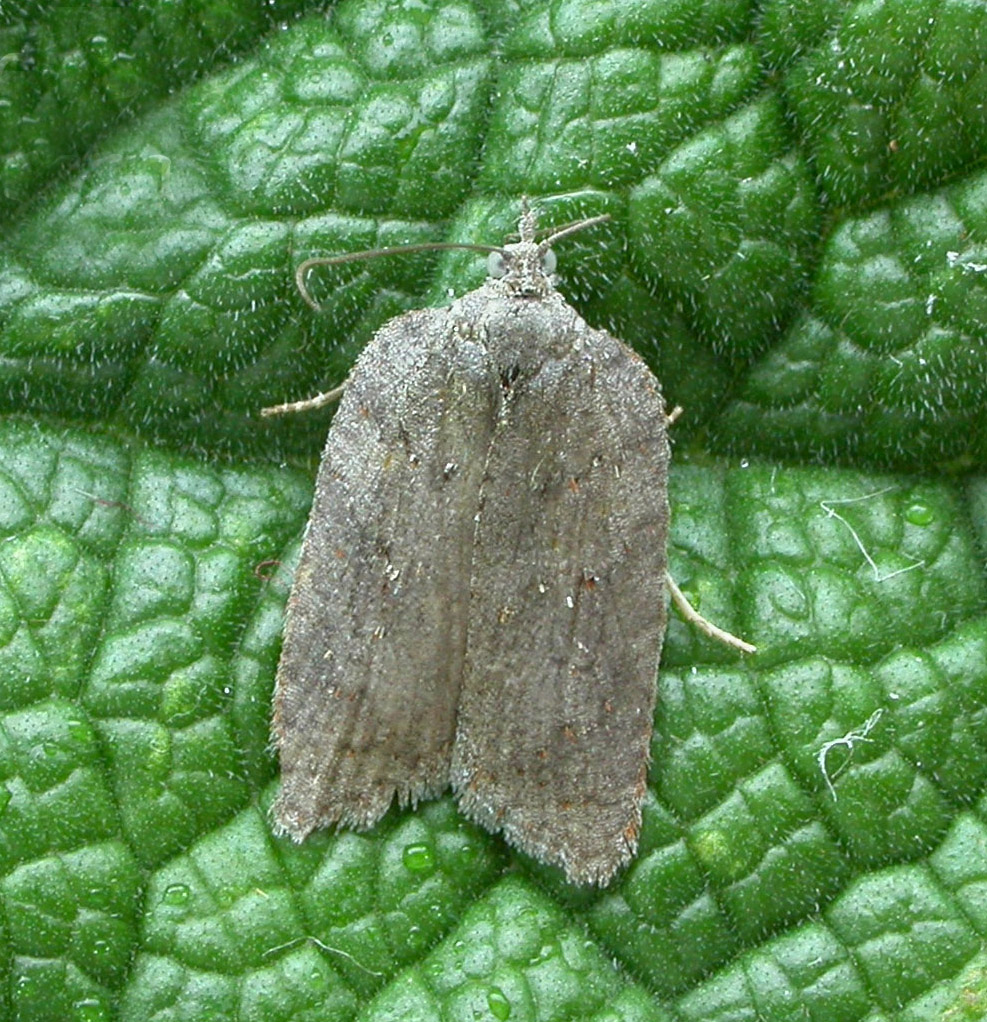

Scientific classification
- Domain: Eukaryota
- Kingdom: Animalia
- Phylum: Arthropoda
- Class: Insecta
- Order: Lepidoptera
- Family: Tortricidae
- Genus: Acleris
- Species: A. sparsana

Binomial name
- Acleris sparsana (Denis & Schiffermüller, 1775)

Synonyms
- List: Tortrix sparsana [Denis & Schiffermuller], 1775; Peronea fagana Curtis, 1834; Tortrix favillaceana Hubner, [1796-1799]; Tortrix halliana Thunberg & Becklin, 1791; Peronea sparsana haworthana Sheldon, 1930 (form); Teras lividana Treitschke, 1835; Teras malivorana Ragonot, 1875; Teras pyrivorana Ragonot, 1875; Tortrix reticulana Haworth, [1811]; Pyralis roborana Fabricius, 1787; Teras sparsana var. ruptana Lienig & Zeller, 1846; Pyralis sponsana Fabricius, 1787; Tortrix tristana Haworth, [1811]

= Acleris sparsana =

Species of moth

Acleris sparsana is a moth of the family Tortricidae found in Europe and Iran. It was first described in 1775 by the Austrian lepidopterists Michael Denis and Ignaz Schiffermüller.

== Description ==
The wingspan is 18–22 mm. The forewings are light greyish-ochreous, obscurely strigulated with grey base, central fascia, and costal patch indistinctly darker, fascia darkest towards costa. The hindwings are pale grey.

The moth flies from June to May of the following year.

Larvae at first live in a slight web on the underside of a leaf of beech (Fagus species), hornbeam (Carpinus), sycamore (Acer pseudoplatanus) or field maple (Acer campestre). Later, it constructs a chamber between spun leaves as a base from which to feed on the surrounding foliage. Pupation occurs on the leaves, or in a slight cocoon on the ground. The adult hibernates.

== Distribution ==
It is found from western Europe to the Caucasus and Iran.
