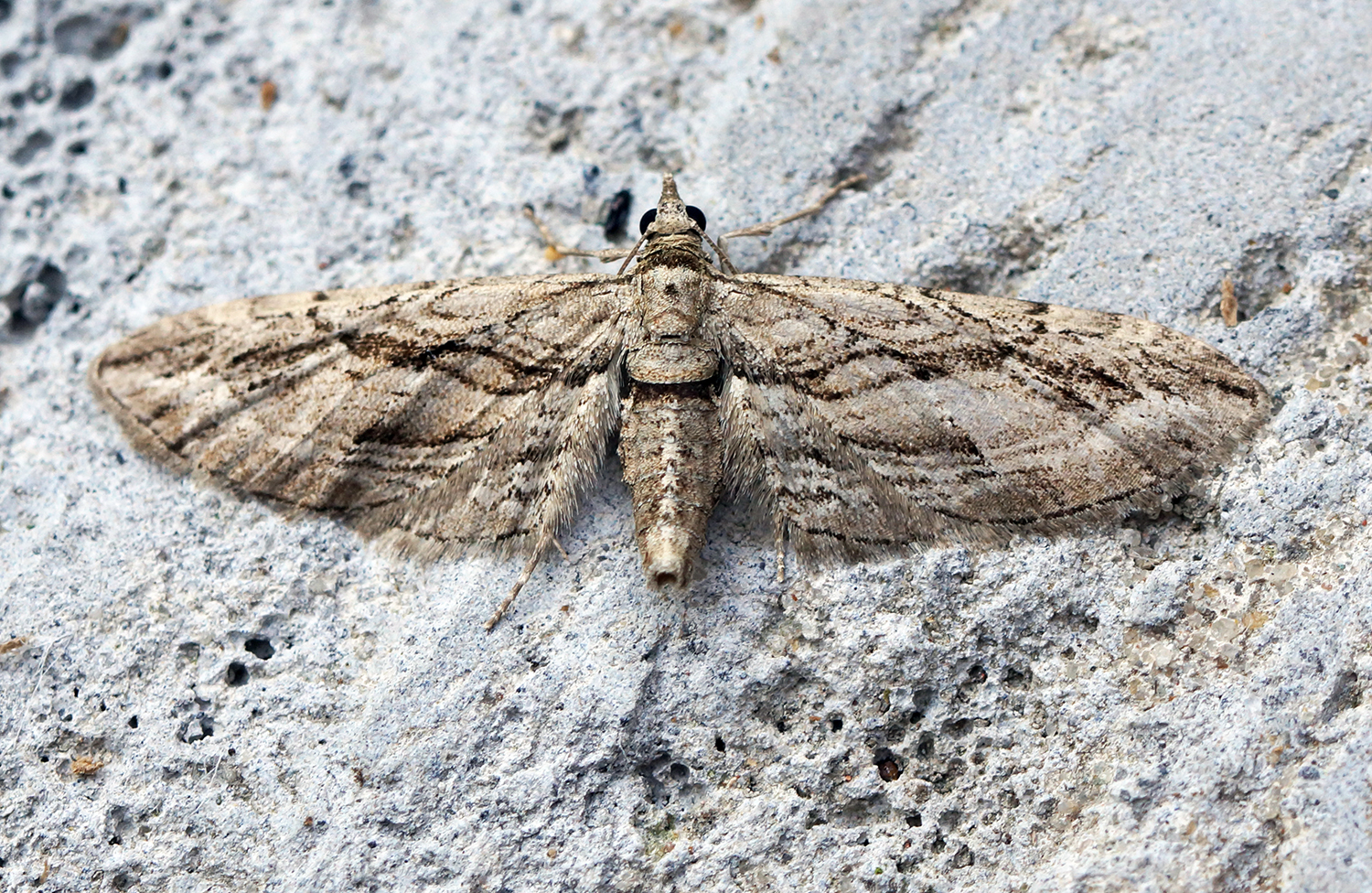

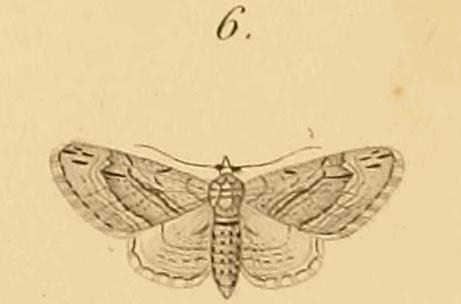
- Rambur's original illustration

Scientific classification
- Domain: Eukaryota
- Kingdom: Animalia
- Phylum: Arthropoda
- Class: Insecta
- Order: Lepidoptera
- Family: Geometridae
- Genus: Eupithecia
- Species: E. phoeniceata

Binomial name
- Eupithecia phoeniceata (Rambur, 1834)

Synonyms
- Larentia phoeniceata Rambur, 1834; Eupithecia mnemosynata Milliere, 1876

= Eupithecia phoeniceata =

Species of moth

Eupithecia phoeniceata, the cypress pug, is a moth of the family Geometridae. The species was first described by Jules Pierre Rambur in 1834 and it can be found in Europe.

The wingspan is 18–22 mm. The ground colour of the forewings is grey or pale greyish ochreous conspicuously patterned with a characteristic extremely oblique pale median fascia, which makes the wing appear narrower than it really is. There are blackish-marked veins near the termen. Forewings with a small dark discal spot. The forewings are distinctly elongate. The hindwings have variable markings but usually resemble the forewings. The thorax is grey, with an anterior black collar.

The moths flies from August to September depending on the location.

The larvae feed on Cupressus macrocarpa and other cultivars.
