= Blastobasis vittata =

Scientific classification
- Kingdom: Animalia
- Phylum: Arthropoda
- Clade: Pancrustacea
- Class: Insecta
- Order: Lepidoptera
- Family: Blastobasidae
- Genus: Blastobasis
- Species: B. vittata

Binomial name
- Blastobasis vittata (Wollaston, 1858)

Synonyms
- Laverna vittata Wollaston, 1858; Blastobasis lignea Walsingham, 1894; Blastobasis flavescentella Rebel, 1940

Species of moth in genus Blastobasis

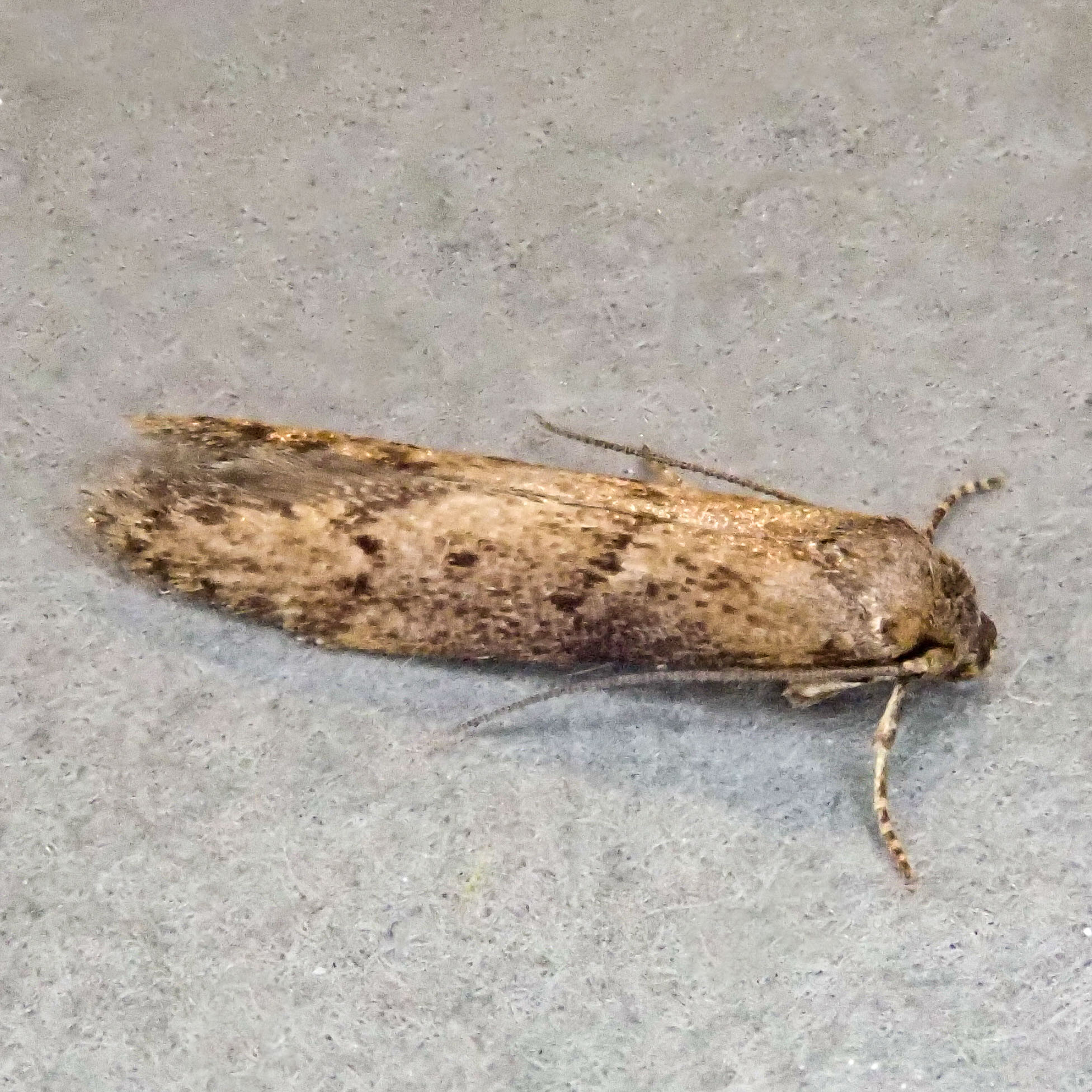
Blastobasis vittata

Blastobasis vittata is a moth of the family Blastobasidae. It was thought to be endemic to Madeira but is now known to inhabit the Netherlands, France, the Channel Islands, England and Northern Ireland.

== Taxonomy ==
The name Blastobasis lignea was for a time used for records now identified as Blastobasis adustella. Karsholt & Sinev's taxonomic revision in 2004 reclassified Walsingham's original B. lignea specimen as B. vittata, making lignea properly the junior synonym of vittata. B. adustella was originally described by Walsingham as a variety of B. lignea.
