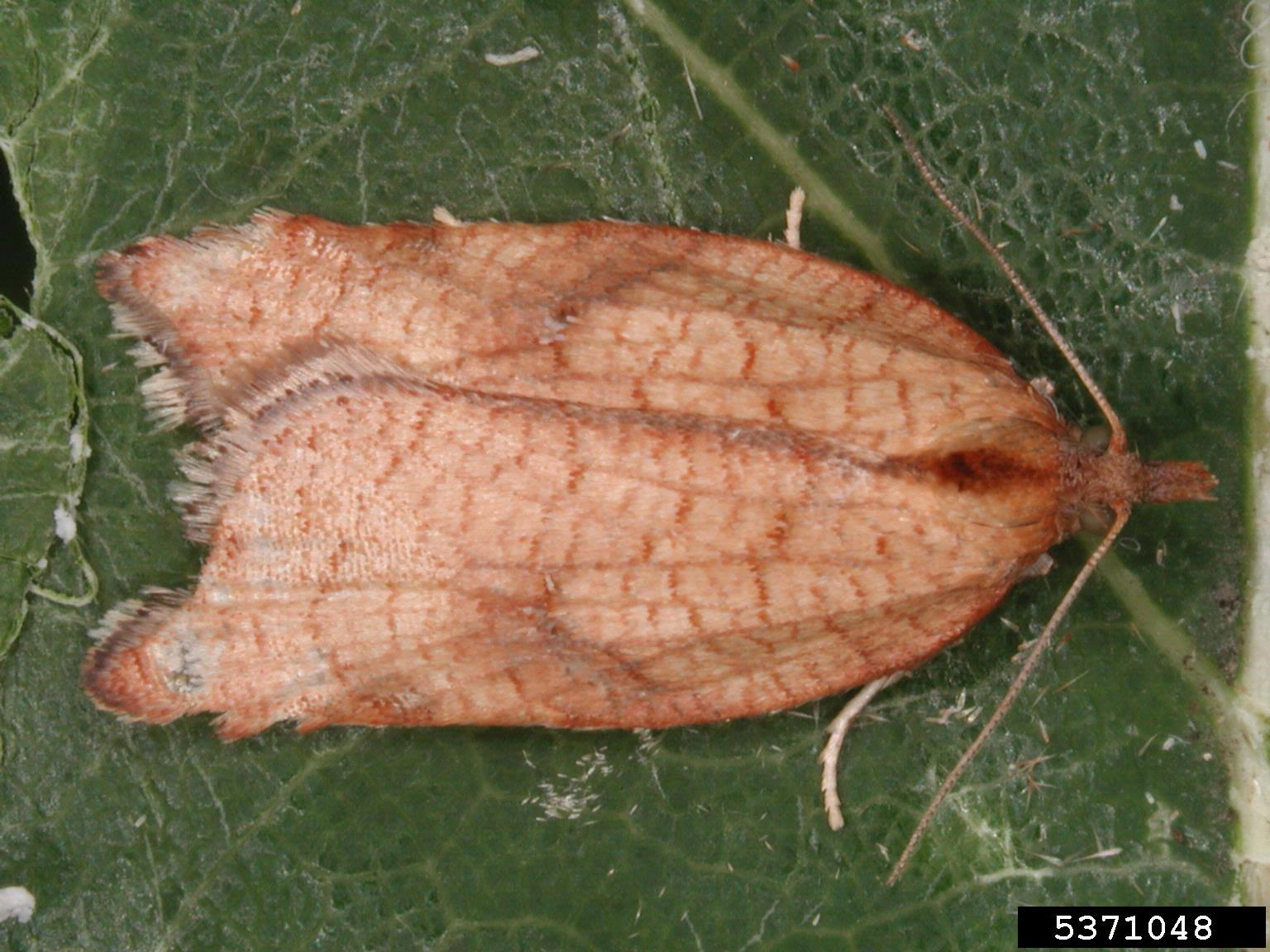

Scientific classification
- Domain: Eukaryota
- Kingdom: Animalia
- Phylum: Arthropoda
- Class: Insecta
- Order: Lepidoptera
- Family: Tortricidae
- Genus: Acleris
- Species: A. rhombana

Binomial name
- Acleris rhombana (Denis & Schiffermüller, 1775)

Synonyms
- Tortrix rhombana [Denis & Schiffermuller], 1775; Pyralis centrana Fabricius, 1794; Tortrix ciliana Hubner, [1796-1799]; Tortrix contaminana Hubner, [1796-1799]; Tortrix contaminiana Haworth, [1811]; Tortrix dimidiana Frolich, 1828; Phalaena obscurana Donovan, [1806]; Phalaena reticulana Strm, 1783; Tortrix reticulata Kennel, 1908; Acalla rhombana ab. unicolorana Strand, 1902

= Acleris rhombana =

Species of moth

Acleris rhombana, the rhomboid tortrix, is a moth of the family Tortricidae. It is found in the Palearctic realm, from Europe to the Caucasus, Armenia, and Turkmenistan.

The wingspan is 14–18 mm. The forewings are suboblong, apex rather strongly prominent, whitish-ochreous to reddish-ochreous, sometimes much mixed with fuscous, strigulated with dark fuscous or ferruginous. The veins are dark fuscous and the tufts very slight. The edge of the basal patch is usually dark fuscous and the angulated central fascia and costal patch are often rather dark fuscous, sometimes united in the disc. The apical half of cilia is white on upper part of the termen. The hindwings are grey-whitish, indistinctly strigulated with grey. The larva is pale green-yellowish; head pale brown; anal plate green. Julius von Kennel provides a full description.

The moths are on wing from June to November depending on the location.

The larvae feed on various trees and shrubs, including Crataegus, Malus, Pyrus, Prunus and Rosaceae species.
