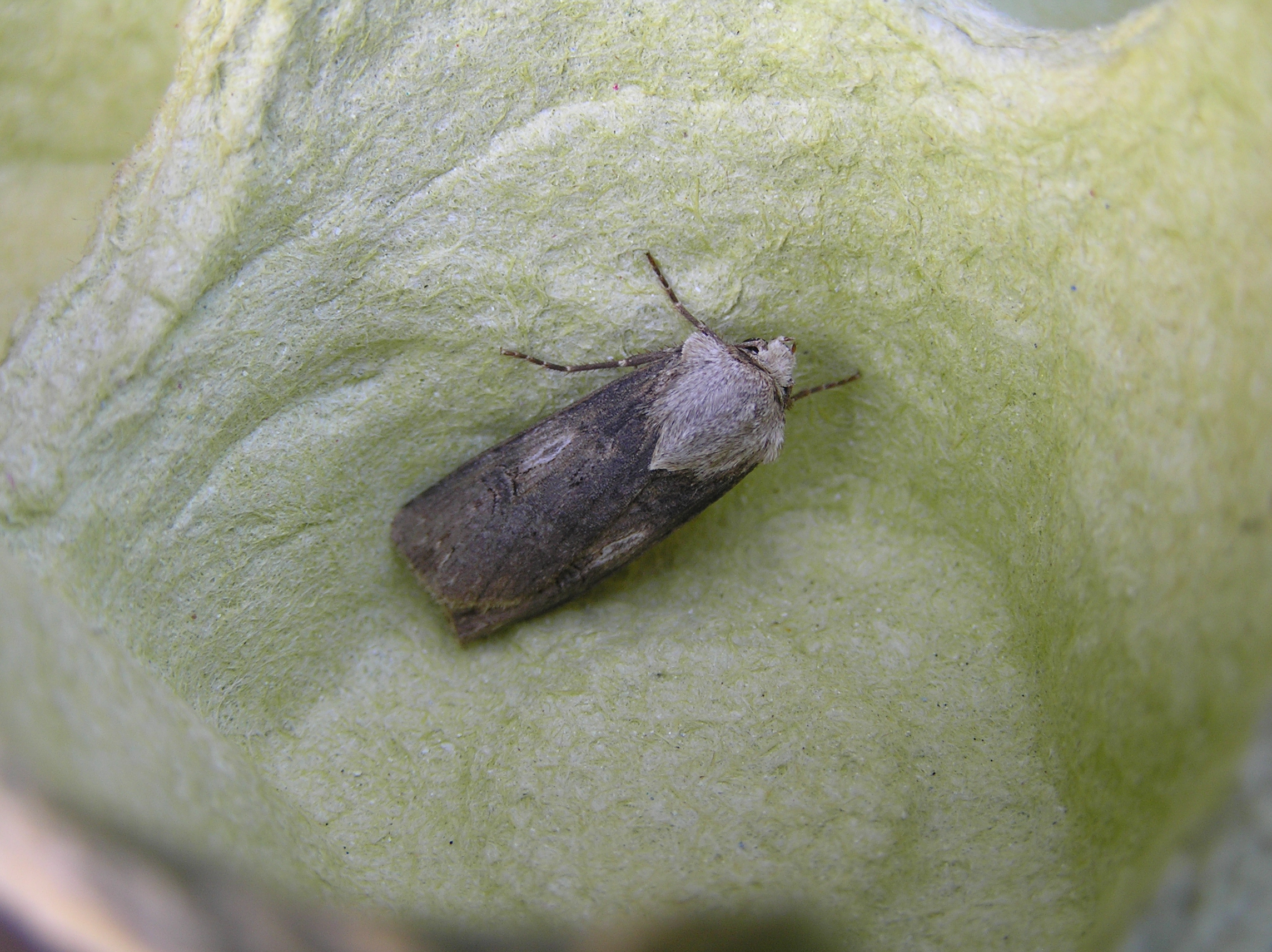

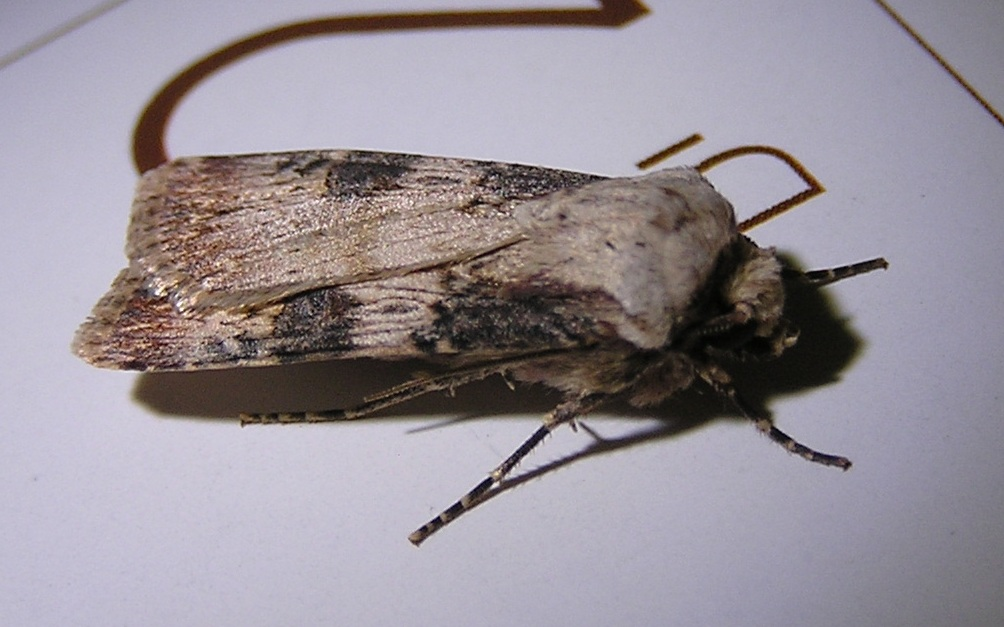

Conservation status
- Least Concern (IUCN 3.1) (Europe regional assessment)

Scientific classification
- Kingdom: Animalia
- Phylum: Arthropoda
- Clade: Pancrustacea
- Class: Insecta
- Order: Lepidoptera
- Superfamily: Noctuoidea
- Family: Noctuidae
- Genus: Agrotis
- Species: A. puta

Binomial name
- Agrotis puta (Hübner, 1803)

Synonyms
- Agrotis renitens (Hübner, 1824); Noctua renitens Hübner, 1824; Euxoa renitens (Hübner, 1824); Noctua puta Hübner, [1803]; Bombyx radius Haworth, 1803; Euxoa rotroui Rothschild, 1920; Noctua lignosa Godart, 1825; (preocc.): Xylina erythroxylea Treitschke, 1826; Agrotis radiola Stephens, 1829; Aporophyla catalaunensis Milliere, 1873; Agrotis puta var. meridionalis Spuler, 1905; Euxoa andreasi Turati, 1924; Euxoa hoggarti var. minima Turati, 1924; Euxoa silvestrii Turati, 1924

= Agrotis puta =

Shuttle-shaped dart

Species of moth

Agrotis puta, the shuttle-shaped dart, is a moth of the family Noctuidae. The species was first described by Jacob Hübner in 1803. It is common in the western part of Europe, but is also found in southern and central Europe, as well as North Africa and the Middle East.

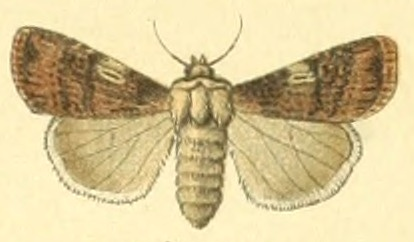
Female, illustrated

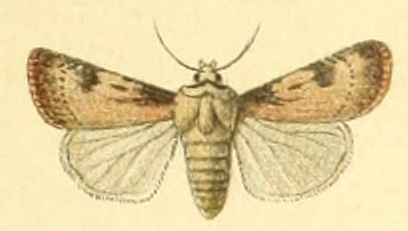
Male, illustrated

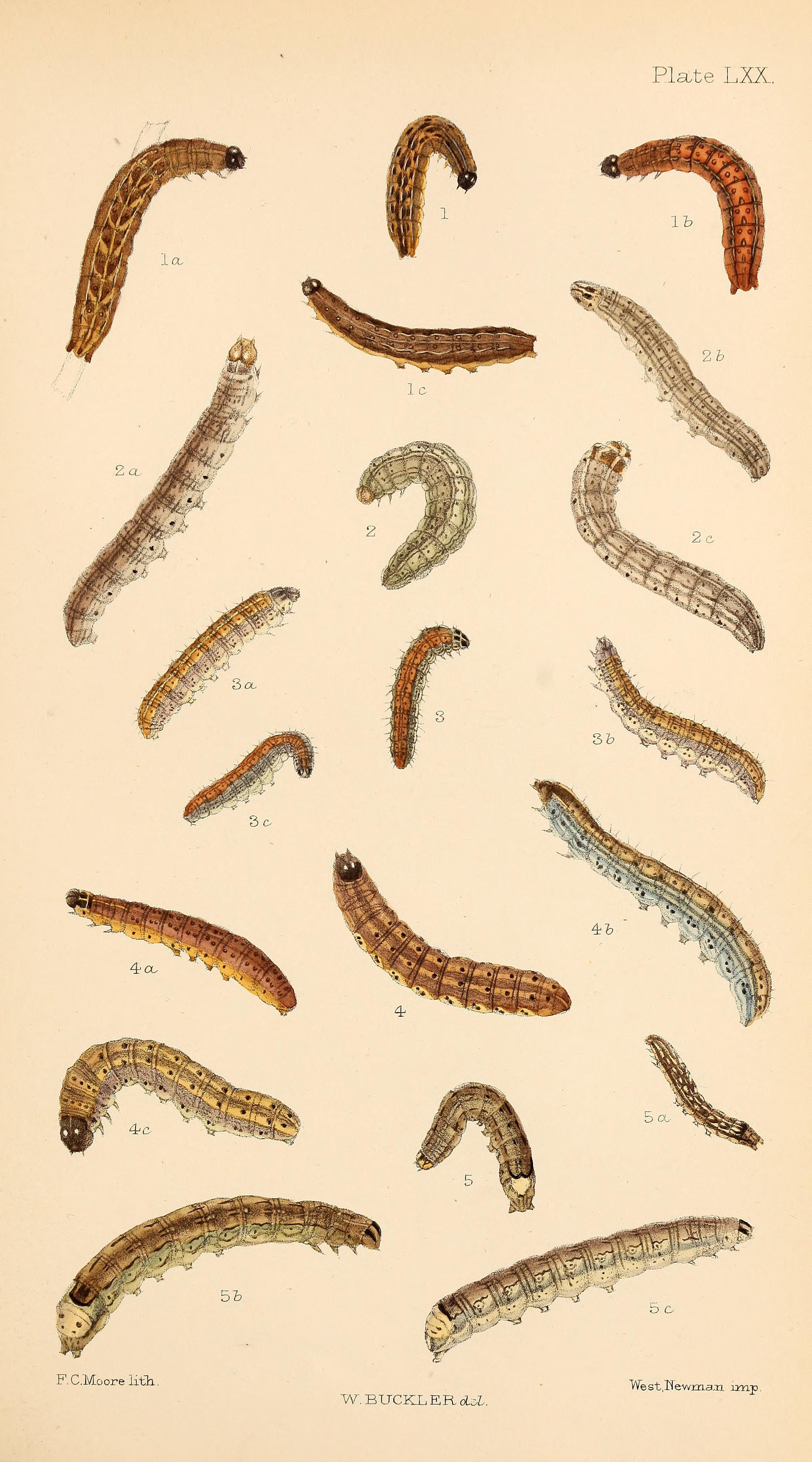
Figs 3,3a,3b,3c larva after last moult

The wingspan is 30–32 mm. Adults are on wing from May to October.

The larvae feed on various low growing plants.

== Subspecies ==
- Agrotis puta puta
- Agrotis puta insula (Isles of Scilly)
