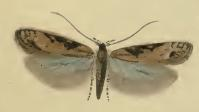

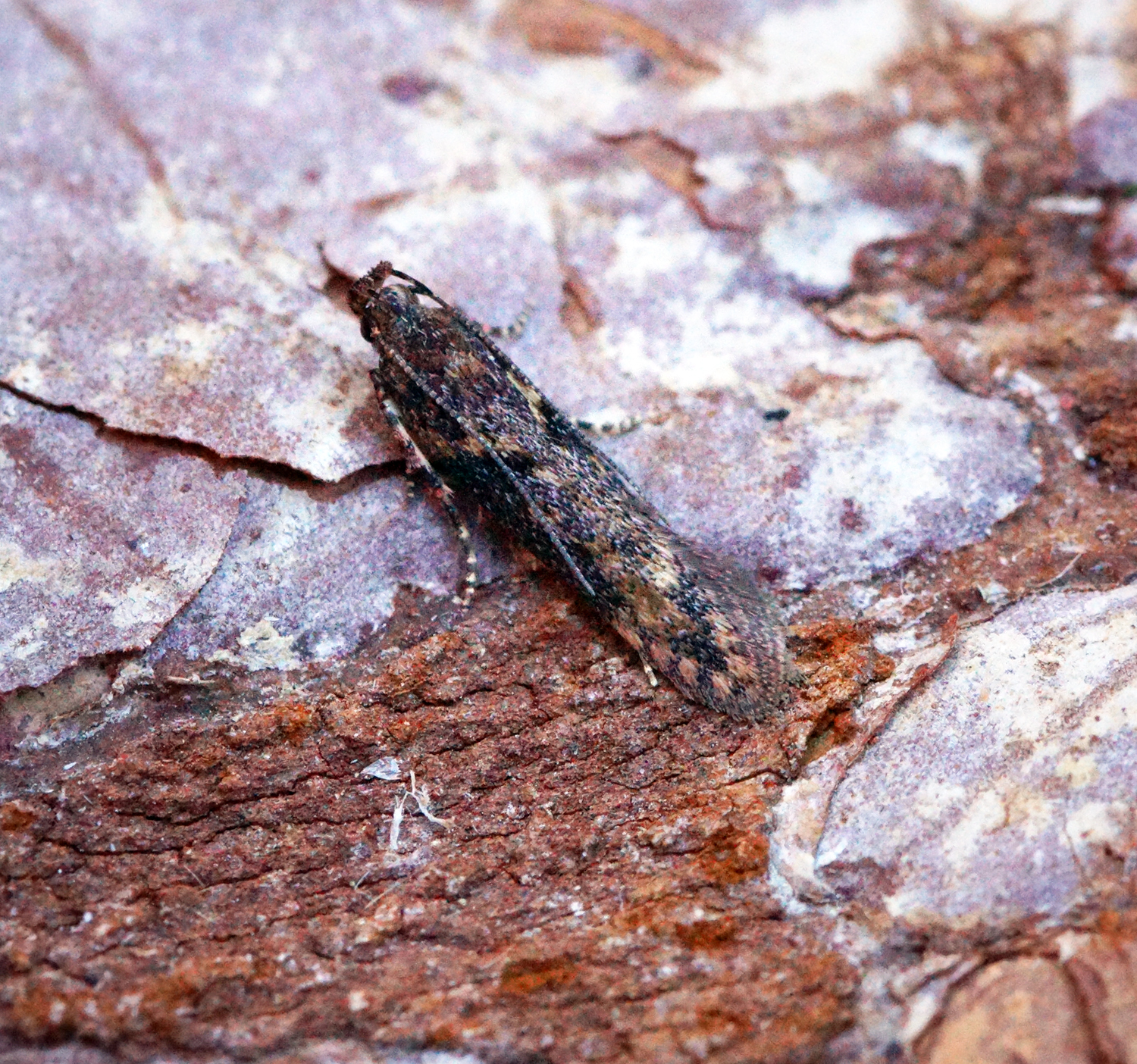

Scientific classification
- Kingdom: Animalia
- Phylum: Arthropoda
- Class: Insecta
- Order: Lepidoptera
- Family: Gelechiidae
- Genus: Scrobipalpa
- Species: S. costella

Binomial name
- Scrobipalpa costella (Humphreys & Westwood, 1845)

Synonyms
- Anacampsis costella Humphreys & Westwood, 1845; Gnorimoschema costellum; Gelechia costimaculella Bruand, 1859

= Scrobipalpa costella =

Species of moth

Scrobipalpa costella is a moth of the family Gelechiidae. It is found in western Europe.

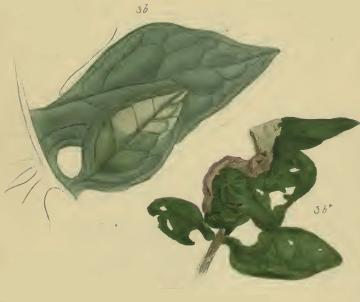
Mined and discoloured leaves of Solanum dulcamara

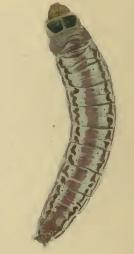
Larva

The wingspan is 9.5–15.5 mm (0.37–0.61 in). The head is ochreous, sometimes grey-sprinkled. Terminal joint of palpi shorter than second. Forewings reddish -ochreous, sometimes suffusedly irrorated with dark fuscous; a dark fuscous triangular costal blotch extending from 1/4 to 2/3 and reaching fold, including the black stigmata, first discal followed by another black dot obliquely beneath it; an indistinct pale angulated fascia at 3/4; often a dark fuscous terminal suffusion. Hindwings 1, grey. The larva is greyish green; dorsal and subdorsal lines sometimes darker; 2 and 3 dark purplish-brown; head and plate of 2 black.

Adults appear in September and spend the winter. After overwintering, they are on wing till June.

The larvae feed on Solanum dulcamara. They mine the leaves of their host plant. Larvae can be found from mid September to June.
