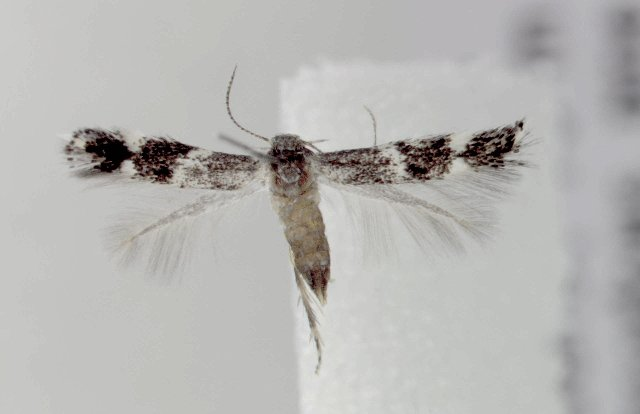

Scientific classification
- Domain: Eukaryota
- Kingdom: Animalia
- Phylum: Arthropoda
- Class: Insecta
- Order: Lepidoptera
- Family: Elachistidae
- Genus: Elachista
- Species: E. consortella

Binomial name
- Elachista consortella Stainton, 1851

Synonyms
- Cosmiotes consortella

= Elachista consortella =

Species of moth

Elachista consortella is a moth of the family Elachistidae. It is found in most of Europe, except most of the Balkan Peninsula, Poland, Latvia and Finland.

The wingspan is 7–8 millimetres (0.28–0.31 in).The head is grey, face whitish. Forewings are blackish -grey, somewhat paler-sprinkled; a somewhat oblique fascia before middle, in male reduced to a spot on fold, a tornal spot, another on costa opposite, and a more or less developed angular mark beyond and connecting these whitish, in female more distinct; plical stigma elongate, black. Hindwings rather dark grey.

Adults are on wing from April to September.

The larvae possibly feed on Bermuda grass (Cynodon dactylon), although other records state it feeds on annual meadow grass (Poa annua). They mine the leaves of their host plant. Larvae can be found from April to August.
