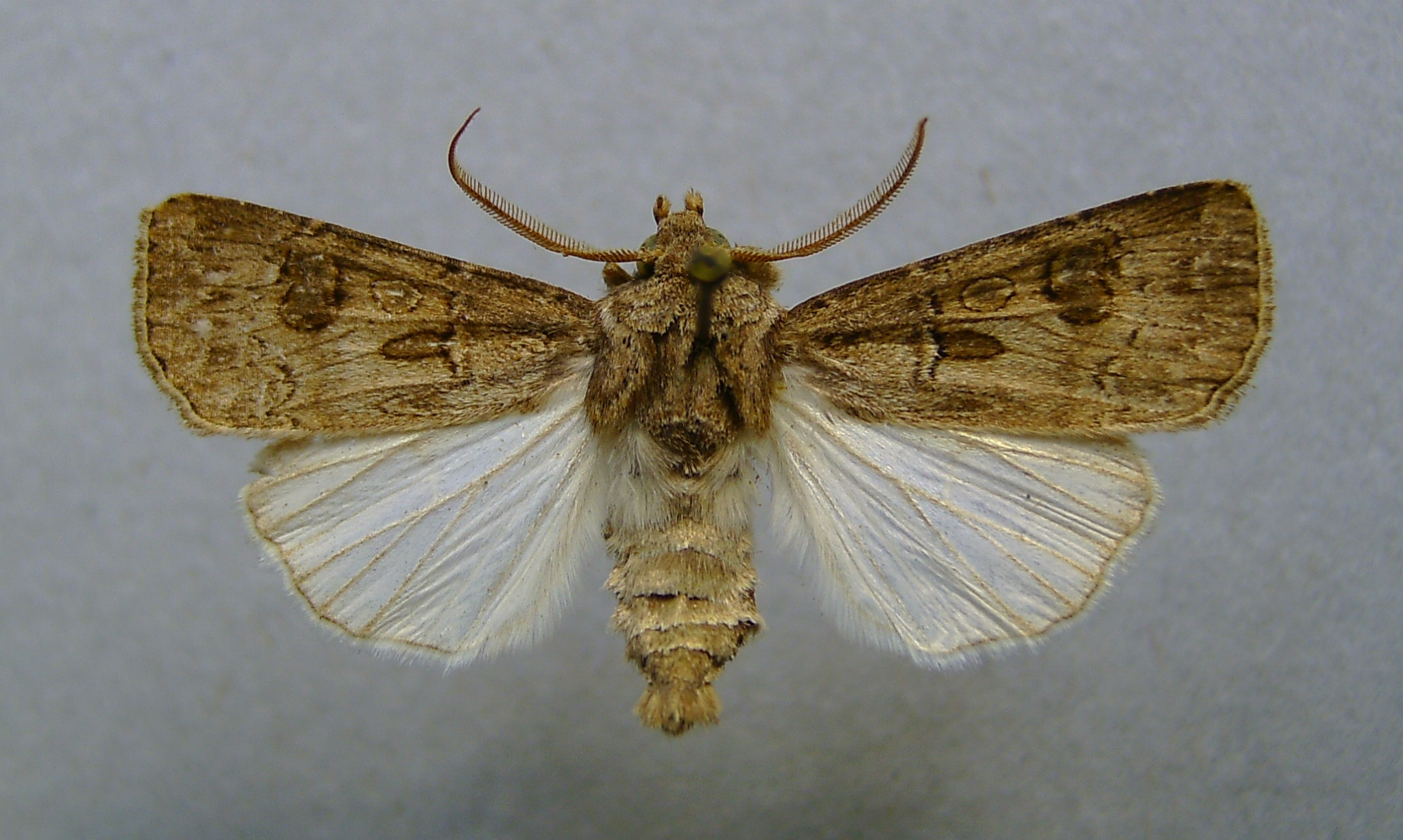

Conservation status
- Least Concern (IUCN 3.1) (Europe regional assessment)

Scientific classification
- Kingdom: Animalia
- Phylum: Arthropoda
- Clade: Pancrustacea
- Class: Insecta
- Order: Lepidoptera
- Superfamily: Noctuoidea
- Family: Noctuidae
- Genus: Agrotis
- Species: A. bigramma

Binomial name
- Agrotis bigramma (Esper, 1790)

Synonyms
- Agrotis crassa (Hübner, 1803); Noctua crassa Hübner, 1803; Euxoa crassa; Euxoa golickei; Euxoa lata

= Agrotis bigramma =

Great dart

Species of moth

Agrotis bigramma, the great dart, is a moth of the family Noctuidae. The species was first described by Eugenius Johann Christoph Esper in 1790. It occurs in Europe, North Africa, and Asia east to Afganistan and SW Siberia; it is widespread in much of Europe but scarce or absent in the northern parts (it is a rare visitor Great Britain).

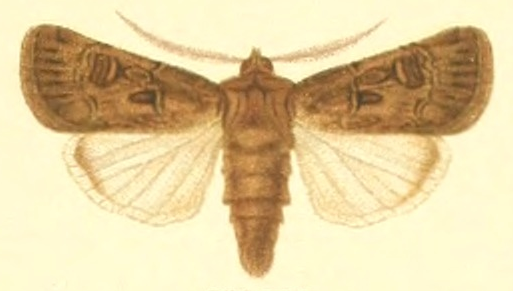
Illustration

The wingspan is 40–48 mm. Adults are on wing from July to December (primarily August in the UK, September to November in the south). There is one generation per year.

The larvae are polyphagous and are found on the roots and lower parts of various low-growing herbaceous plants including Poaceae and Scrophulariaceae.
