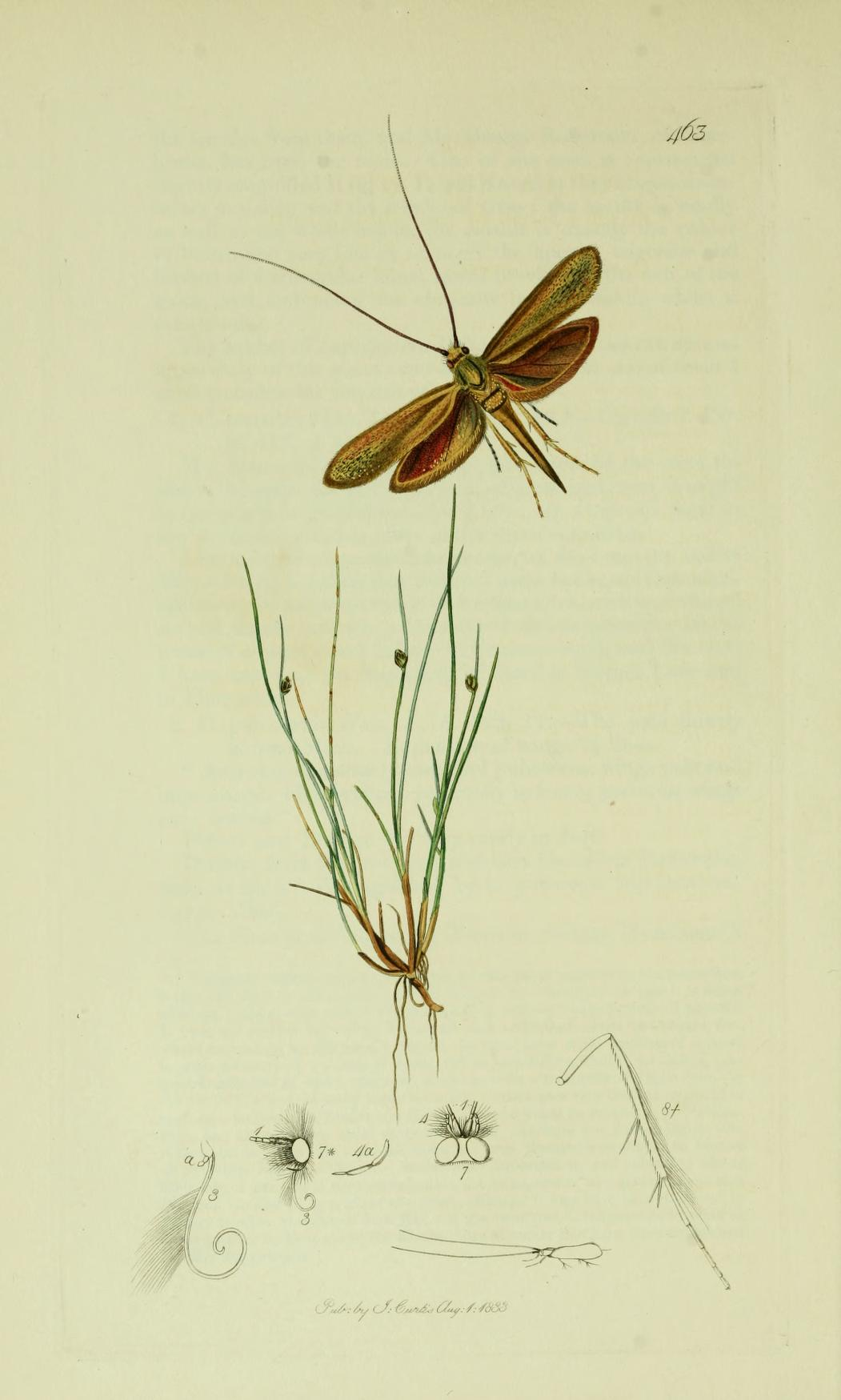
- Illustration from John Curtis's British Entomology Volume 6

Scientific classification
- Kingdom: Animalia
- Phylum: Arthropoda
- Class: Insecta
- Order: Lepidoptera
- Family: Coleophoridae
- Genus: Coleophora
- Species: C. frischella

Binomial name
- Coleophora frischella (Linnaeus, 1758)

Synonyms
- List: Adela frischella (Linnaeus, 1758); Tinea frischella Linnaeus, 1758; Phalaena frischella Linnaeus, 1758; Coleophora dannehli Toll, 1952; Coleophora auronitella Toll, 1962

= Coleophora frischella =

Species of moth

Coleophora frischella, the clover case-bearer or Frisch's case-moth, is a moth of the family Coleophoridae. It is found in most of Europe, east to the eastern parts of the Palearctic realm. It is also present in the Near East.

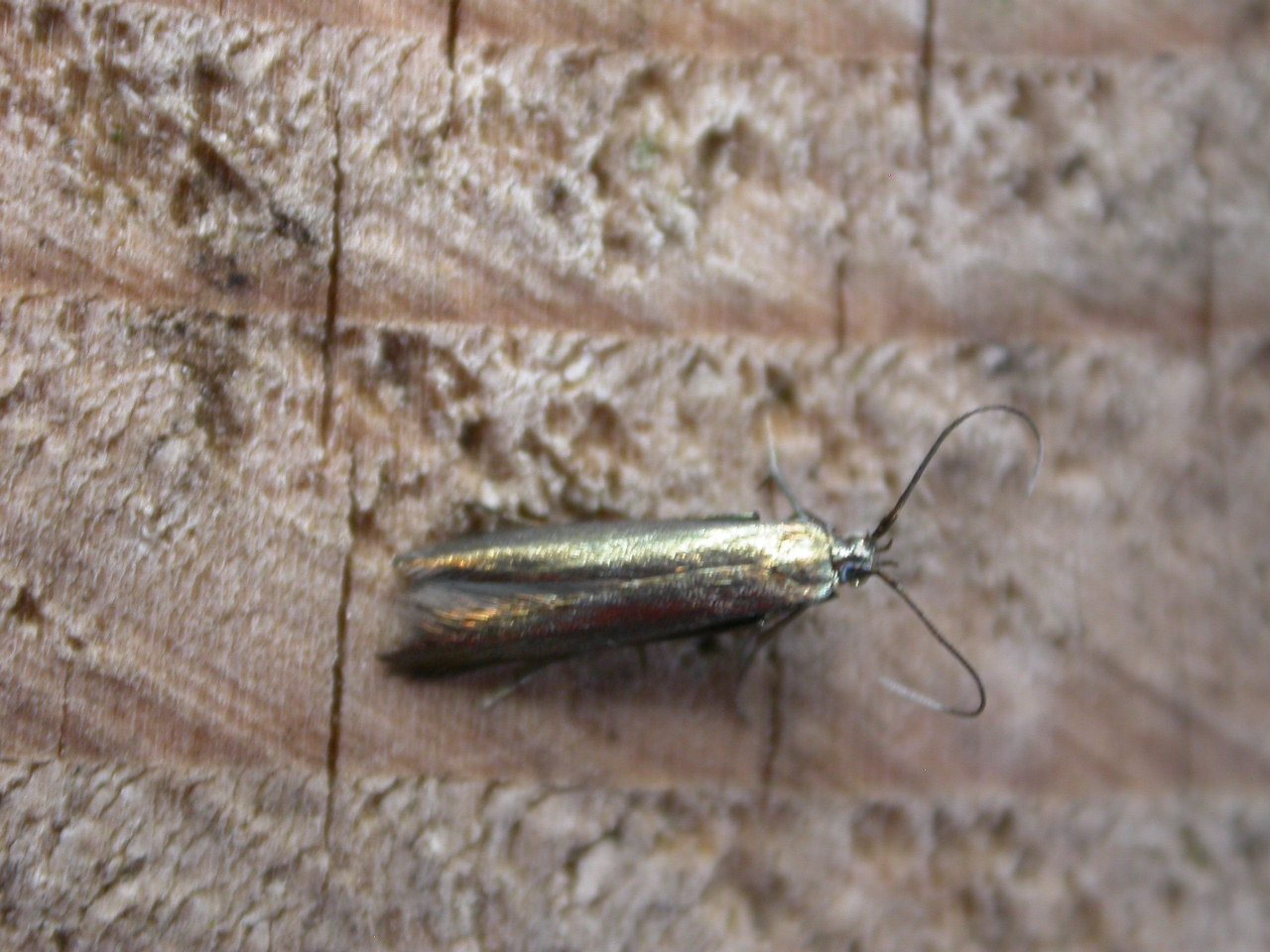
Coleophora sp., possibly frischella

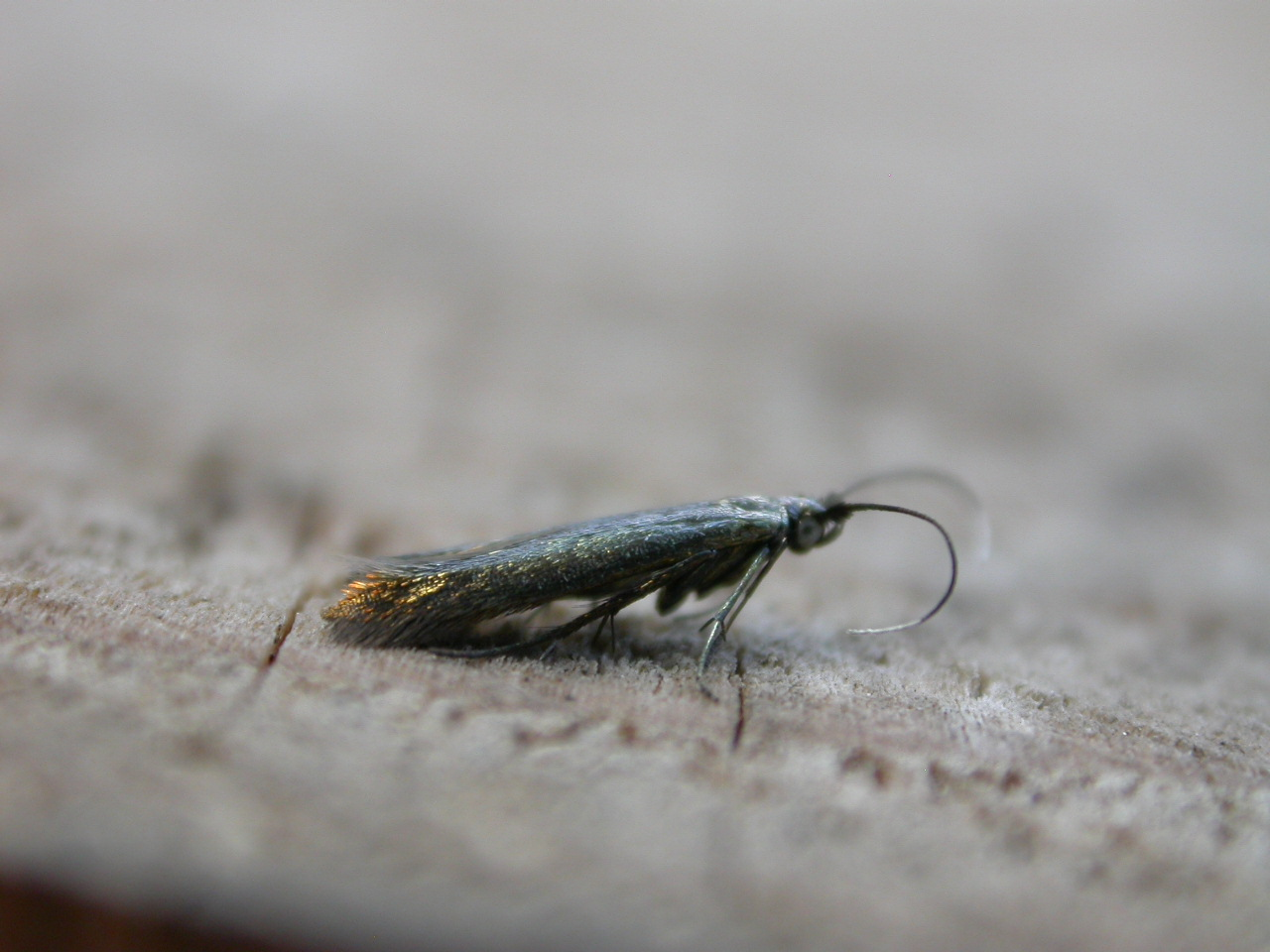
Coleophora sp., possibly frischella

It is indistinguishable of Coleophora alcyonipennella from which it is separable only by dissection.

The wingspan is 11.5–14.5 mm. Adults are on wing from May to June and in August. There are two generations per year.

The larvae feed on the seeds of various Trifolium species.
