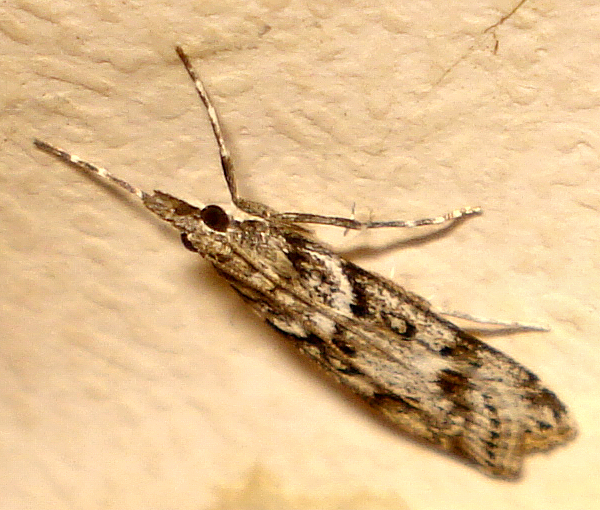

Scientific classification
- Kingdom: Animalia
- Phylum: Arthropoda
- Class: Insecta
- Order: Lepidoptera
- Family: Crambidae
- Genus: Eudonia
- Species: E. angustea

Binomial name
- Eudonia angustea (J.Curtis, 1827)

Synonyms
- Eudorea angustea J.Curtis, 1827; Eudorea acuminatella Stainton, 1859; Eudorea coarctata Zeller, 1846; Eudorea hesperella Heydenreich, 1851; Scoparia coarctalis var. napolitalis Millière, 1870; Scoparia imparilis Dyar, 1929; Scoparia vafra Meyrick, 1913

= Eudonia angustea =

Species of moth

Eudonia angustea is a moth of the family Crambidae described by John Curtis in 1827. It is found in southern and western Europe, the Canary Islands, Madeira and Turkey.

The wingspan is 17–22 mm (0.67–0.87 in). The forewings are narrow, whitish, mixed with brownish and sprinkled with black; base darker; lines whitish, dark-edged, first oblique, second sinuate; orbicular outlined with black; claviform black, touching first line; a black X-shaped discal mark, upper half filled with light brownish; subterminal line cloudy, whitish, hardly touching second. Hindwings are whitish-grey, terminally obscurely darker. The larva is blackish-grey, slightly greenish-tinged; spots darker or almost black; head pale brown; plate of 2 dark brown or almost black.

Adults are on wing from July to late autumn.

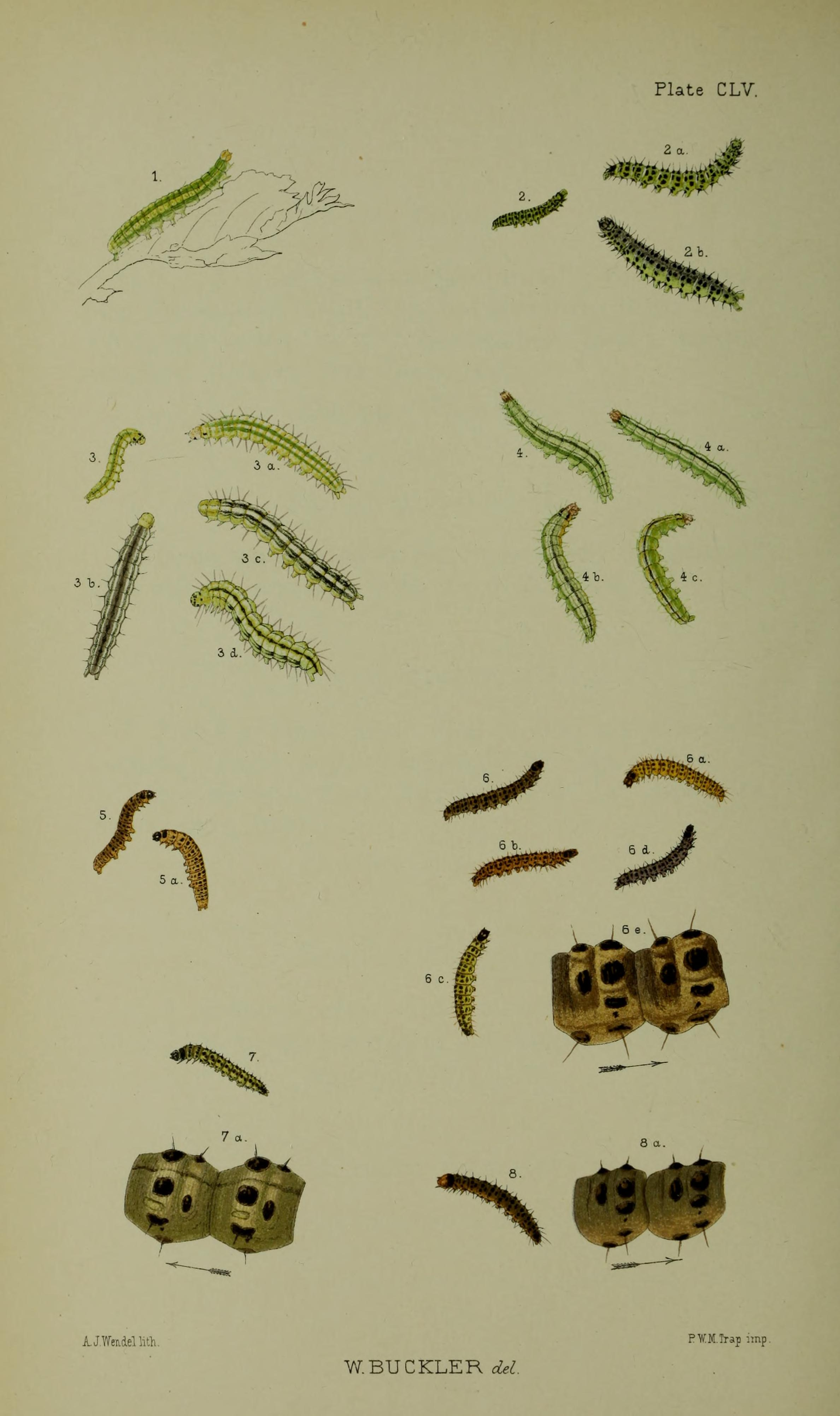
Figs. 8 larva after final moult 8a enlarged figure of two segments

The larvae feed on mosses on walls and in sand dunes.
