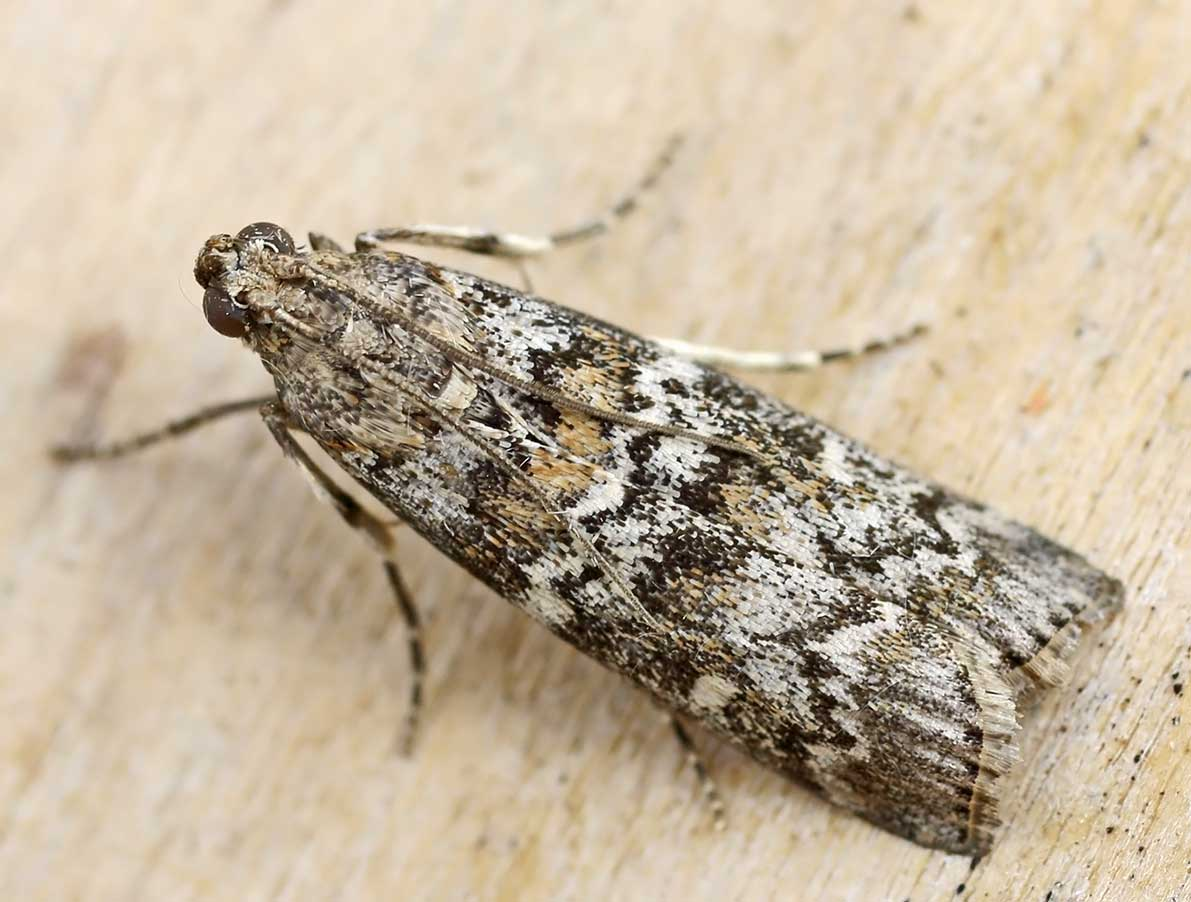

Scientific classification
- Domain: Eukaryota
- Kingdom: Animalia
- Phylum: Arthropoda
- Class: Insecta
- Order: Lepidoptera
- Family: Pyralidae
- Genus: Dioryctria
- Species: D. abietella

Binomial name
- Dioryctria abietella (Denis & Schiffermüller, 1775)

Synonyms
- Tinea abietella Denis & Schiffermüller, 1775; Tinea decuriella Hübner, 1796

= Dioryctria abietella =

Species of moth

Dioryctria abietella is a moth of the family Pyralidae. It is found in Europe.

The wingspan is 27–33 mm.The forewings are fuscous, irrorated with whitish and dark fuscous; first and second lines whitish, dark-edged, waved, nearly parallel, hardly oblique; two darker shades rather before and beyond first line, not reaching costa; a small whitish discal spot, suffusedly darker-edged. Hindwings in male whitish-fuscous, in female light fuscous, darker terminally. Larva dark grey or reddish-brown; dorsal line double, pale; lateral and spiracular lines pale; head and plate of 2 dark brown: in shoots of Pinus sylvestris, not causing resinous exudation.

The moth flies in one generation from the end of May to September.

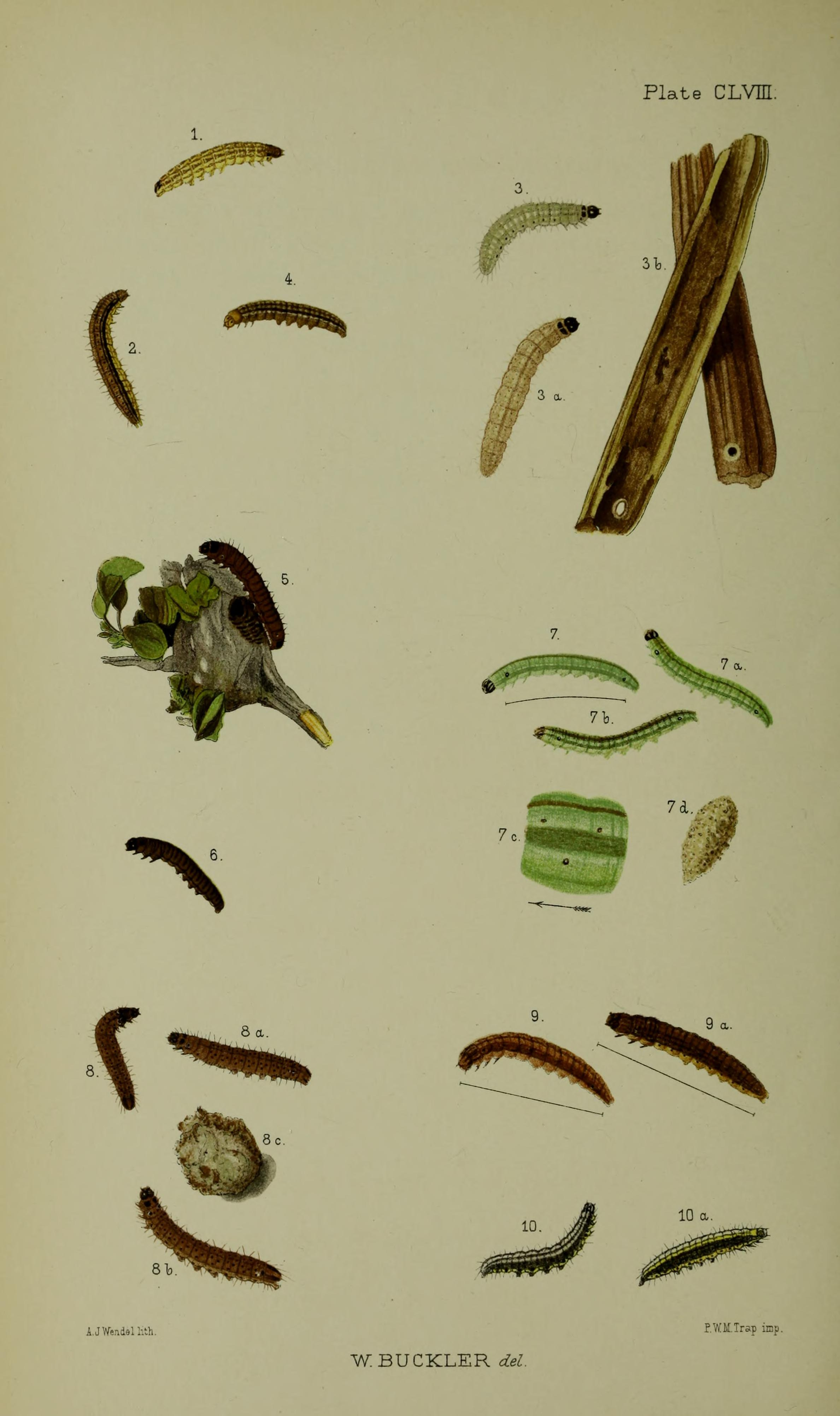
Figs. 8, 8a, 8b larvae in various stages of growth 8c hibernaculum

The caterpillars feed on pine and other conifers.

== Notes ==
1. The flight season refers to Belgium and the Netherlands. This may vary in other parts of the range.
