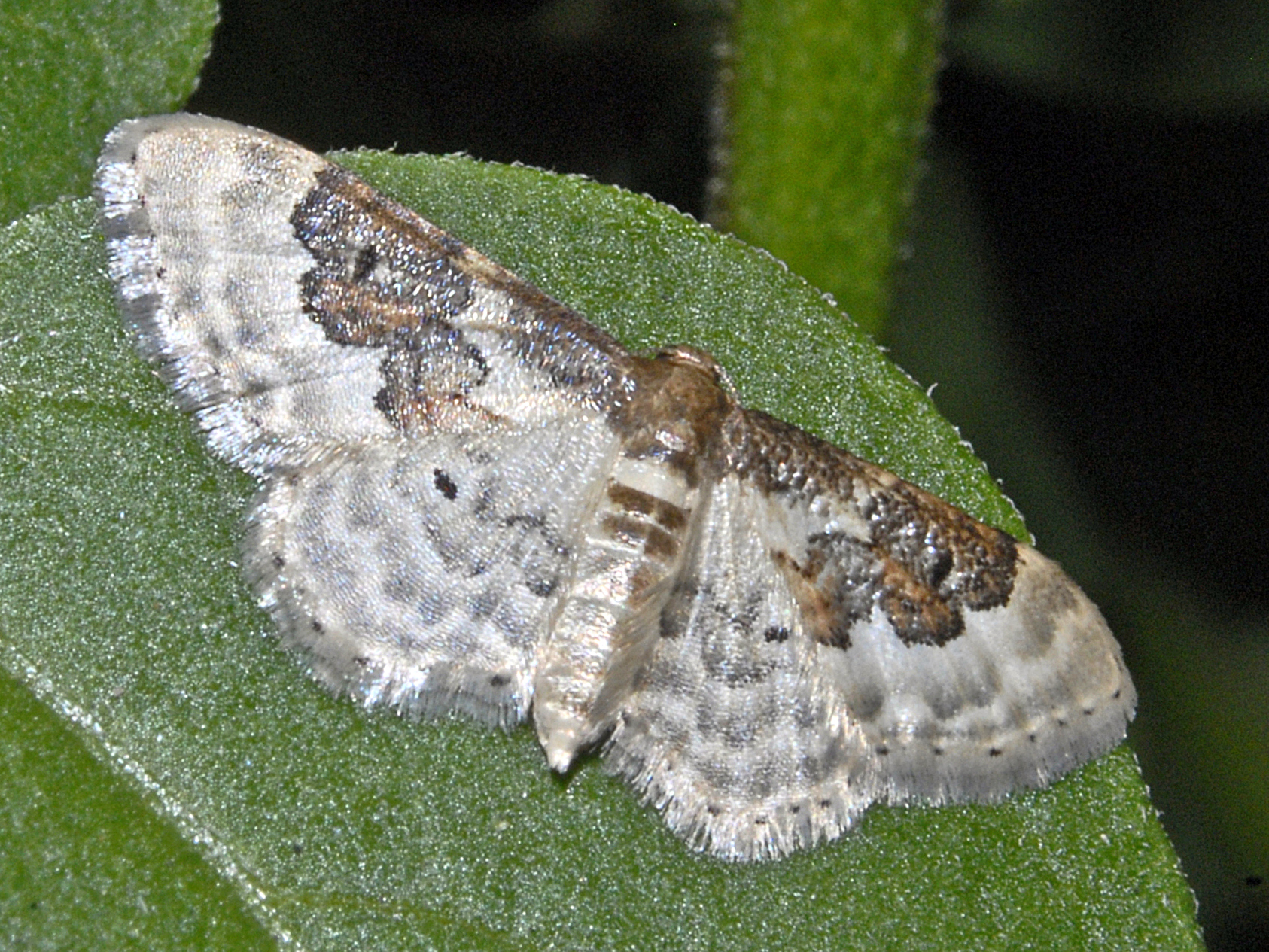

Scientific classification
- Kingdom: Animalia
- Phylum: Arthropoda
- Clade: Pancrustacea
- Class: Insecta
- Order: Lepidoptera
- Family: Geometridae
- Genus: Idaea
- Species: I. rusticata

Binomial name
- Idaea rusticata (Denis & Schiffermüller, 1775)

Synonyms
- Acidalia rusticata; Sterrha rusticata; Idaea vulpinaria Herrich-Schäffer, 1852

= Idaea rusticata =

Species of moth

Idaea rusticata, the least carpet, is a moth of the family Geometridae. The species was first described by Michael Denis and Ignaz Schiffermüller in 1775.

== Distribution ==
This species can be found in most of Europe, in the Near East and in North Africa. From the Balkan Peninsula, the occurrence continues across the Palearctic though Ukraine, southern Russia and Asia Minor to the Caucasus and from there via northern Iran, Afghanistan, Turkmenistan, Kyrgyzstan to the Central Asian mountains as far as Mongolia. Of all moths in Britain it showed the greatest percentage increase in abundance between 1968 and 2007, and expanded its range beyond the vicinity of London.

== Habitat ==
These moths inhabit wastelands, open places, parks and well exposed gardens.

== Description ==
Idaea rusticata has a wingspan of 19–21 mm. The length of the forewings is 9–11 mm. The edges of the wings are fringed. The basic colour is whitish or cream, sometimes with a very light brownish tone. The upperside of the forewings shows in the midfield a dark brown to red-brown transverse drawing, with a point-shaped black spot, always within the dark field. This brown marking runs from the front to the rear edge. The upperside of the hindwings is light grey, with darker grey transversal lines. The base of the anterior margin is darkened brown. Also in the hindwings a black point is present in the discal cell.

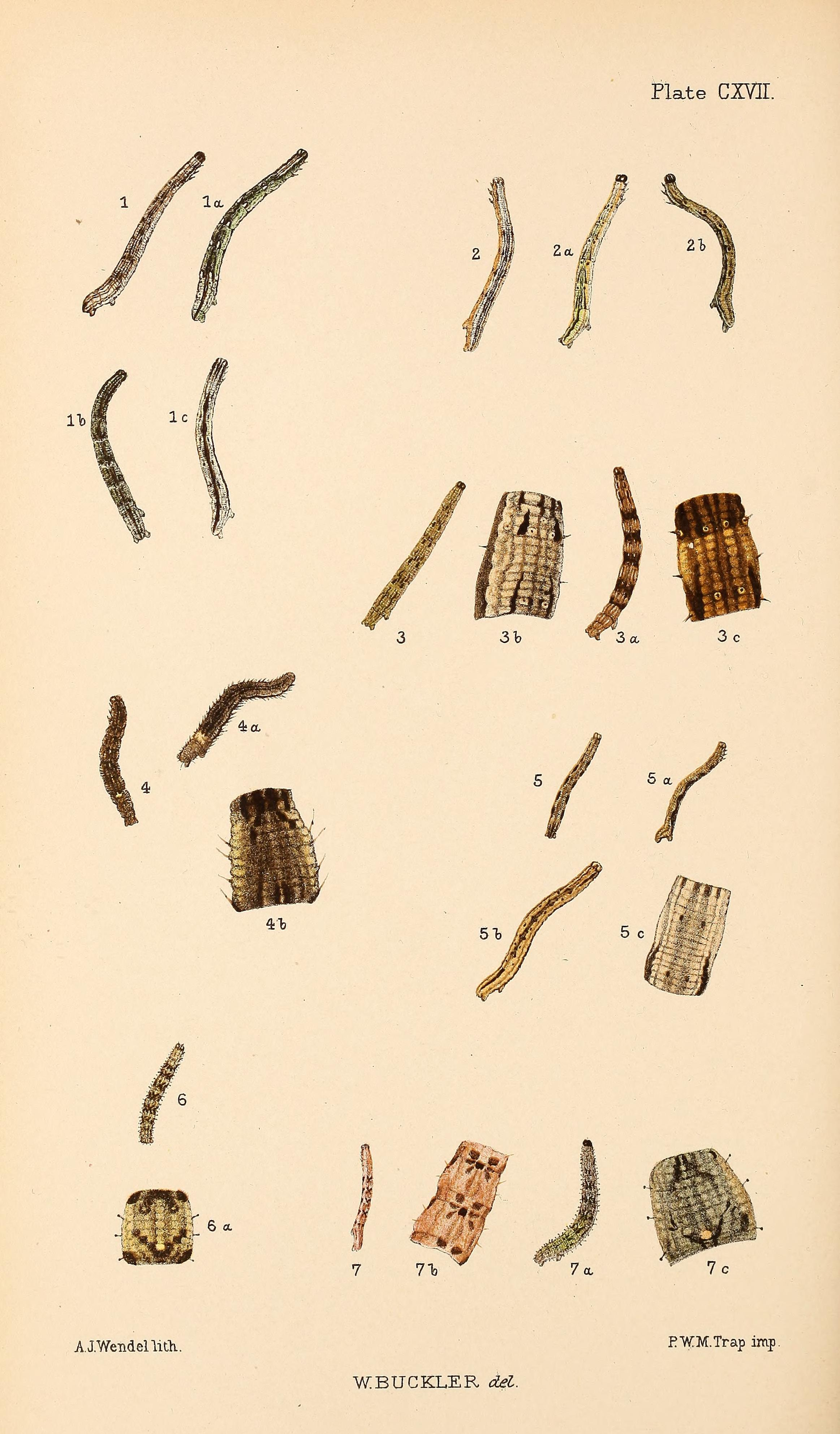
Fig 6 Larva, 6a enlarged detail of segment

The eggs are oval and relatively small. The caterpillar is rather short, becomes thinner towards the hind end, and shows distinct constrictions. It is grey brown or brown and has a narrow, light line on the back. The abdomen is brightly coloured. The head is small and black coloured. The pupa is light brown and has a glossy surface.

== Biology ==
It is usually a univoltine species. In southern Europe, under favourable circumstances, a second generation can also be formed. The second generation is significantly smaller. The adults fly at night from July to August, and are attracted to light. The larvae mainly feed on ivy (Hedera) and traveller's joy (Clematis vitalba). and withered leaves of other herbaceous plants.

1. The flight season refers to the British Isles. This may vary in other parts of the range.
