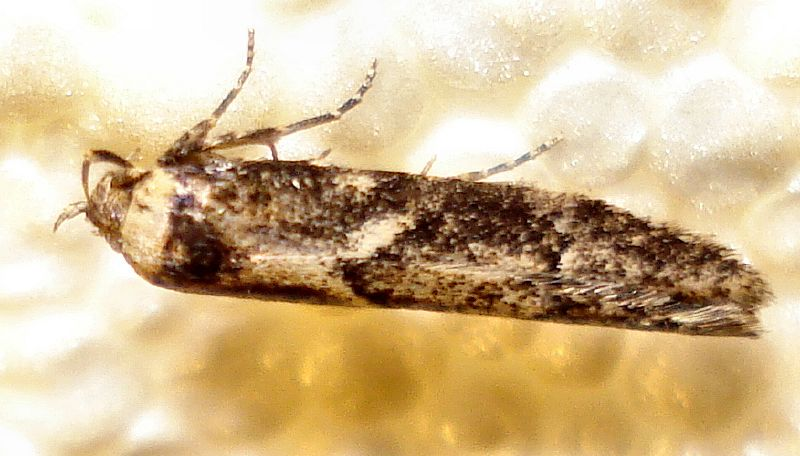
- Adult from Lincolnshire (UK)

Scientific classification
- Kingdom: Animalia
- Phylum: Arthropoda
- Clade: Pancrustacea
- Class: Insecta
- Order: Lepidoptera
- Family: Blastobasidae
- Genus: Blastobasis
- Species: B. adustella

Binomial name
- Blastobasis adustella Walsingham, 1894

Synonyms
- List: Blastobasis lignea auct. non Walsingham, 1894: misidentification; Blastobasis sarcophaga Meyrick 1902; Blastobasis xanthographella Rebel 1940

= Blastobasis adustella =

Species of moth

Blastobasis adustella is a species of moth of the family Blastobasidae. It is endemic to Australian region, but was introduced in western Europe and is now reported from The Netherlands, Great Britain, Ireland, Madeira and the Azores

== Description ==
The wingspan is 15–20 mm. Adults are on wing from August to September.

The larvae feed on a variety of foodstuffs, including decaying vegetable matter as well as the seedheads of wild teasel (Dipsacus fullonum) in Europe.

== Taxonomy ==
The name Blastobasis lignea has often been used for records now considered as Blastobasis adustella. A taxonomic revision by Karsholt & Sinev reclassifies Walsingham's original B. lignea specimen as Blastobasis vittata, making lignea properly the junior synonym of vittata. B. adustella was originally described by Walshingham as a variety of B. lignea.
