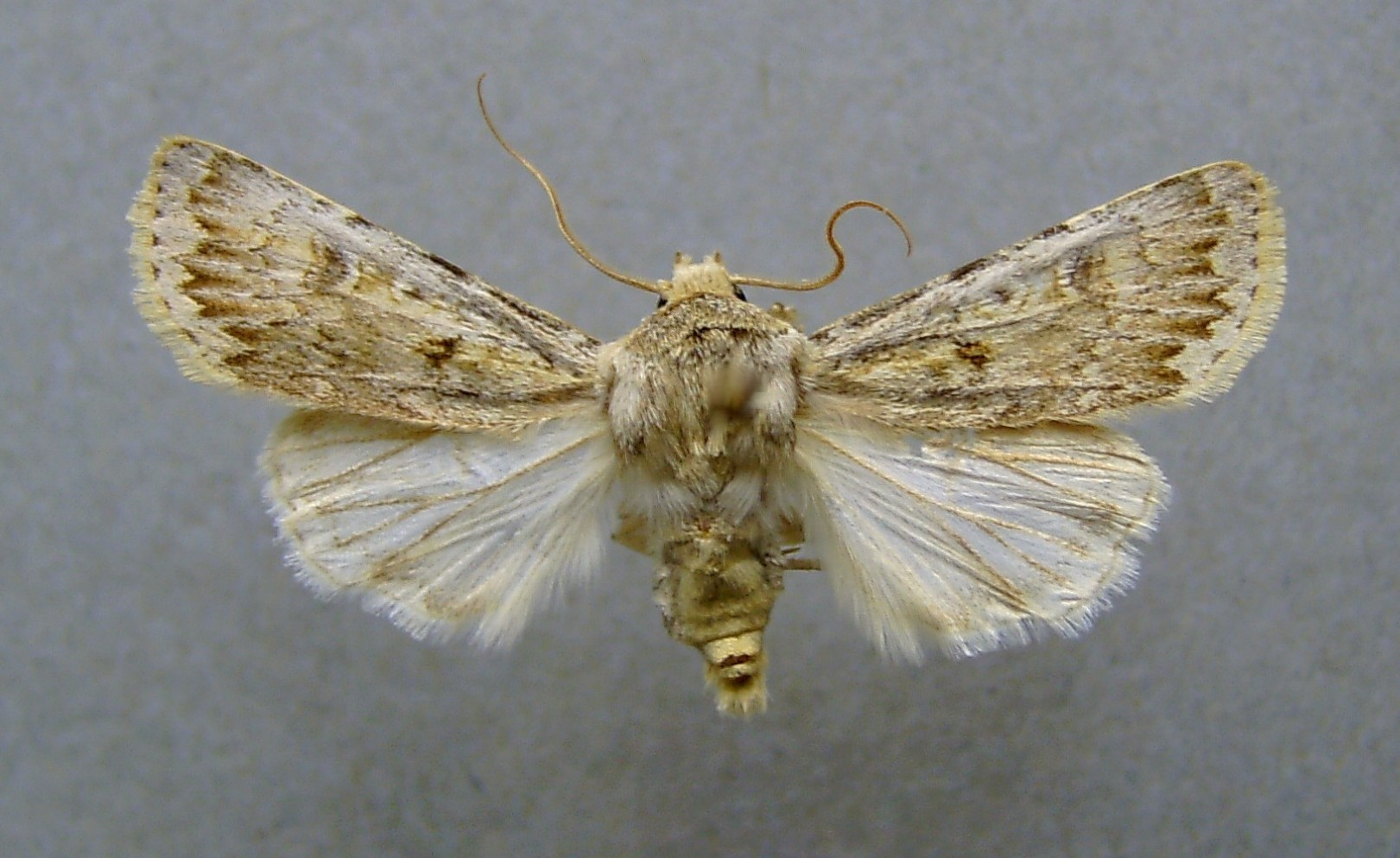

Scientific classification
- Kingdom: Animalia
- Phylum: Arthropoda
- Clade: Pancrustacea
- Class: Insecta
- Order: Lepidoptera
- Superfamily: Noctuoidea
- Family: Noctuidae
- Genus: Agrotis
- Species: A. ripae

Binomial name
- Agrotis ripae (Hübner, 1823)

Synonyms
- Scotia ripae

= Agrotis ripae =

Sand dart

Species of moth

Agrotis ripae, the sand dart, is a moth of the family Noctuidae. The species was first described by Jacob Hübner in 1823. It is found in western Europe and North Africa and extends east across the Palearctic to steppe areas in Russia, Mongolia and Siberia.

== Description ==
The wingspan is 32–42 mm. Forewing rufous brown or rufous grey, mixed with white; a costal streak and the veins whitish; stigmata outlined with brown, the reniform with the centre dark; marginal area often paler; hindwing in male white, in female with the veins and margin grey.

It is a seacoast species or survives in wastes once washed by the sea; occurring in Britain, France, Germany, Denmark, Sweden and Russia; in Mongolia and Siberia, and in Egypt. It is a remarkably variable species of which the chief forms are ab. nebulosa Stph. a pale grey form, with the costa, base, and outer margin fuscous; desertorum Bsd.[now a full species] from southern Russia, Siberia and Egypt is grey with the lines and stigmata dark and distinct. In brunnea Tutt the ground colour is deep reddish ochreous with lines and stigmata fuscous; — grisea Tutt is dark slaty grey with the markings obscured; a row of small whitish subterminal dots; — ab. desillii Pierret is a reddish-grey form, sometimes mixed with yellowish, with the markings well developed; — albicosta Tutt is like it, but with a white costal streak in addition: — lastly, there are two nearly white forms ab. weissenbornii Frr., whitish with the stigmata outlined in black and ab. obotritica Schmidt, chalk-white, with a few traces only of lines and stigmata.

== Biology ==
Adults are on wing from June to July depending on the location.

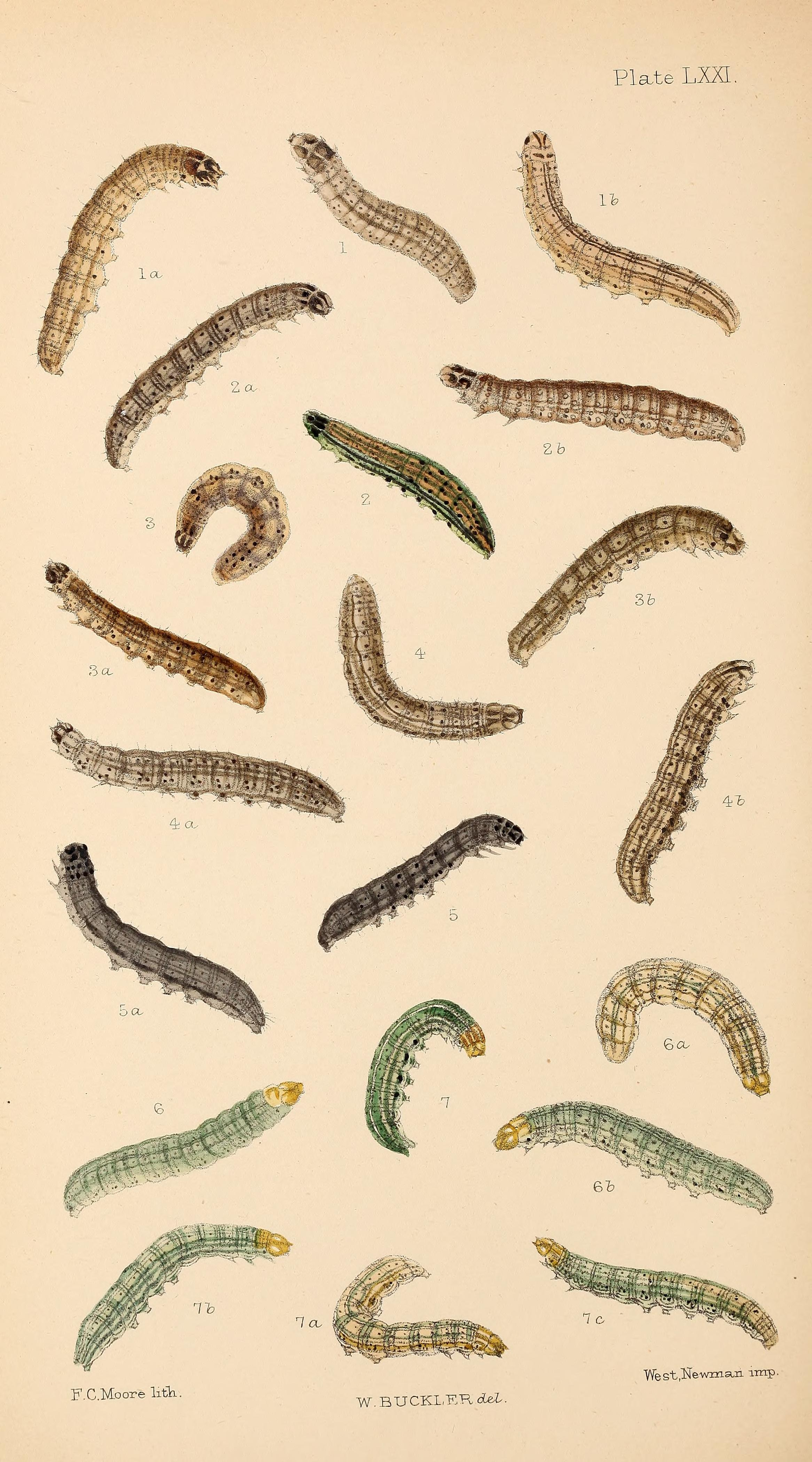
6, 6a, 6b larva after last moult

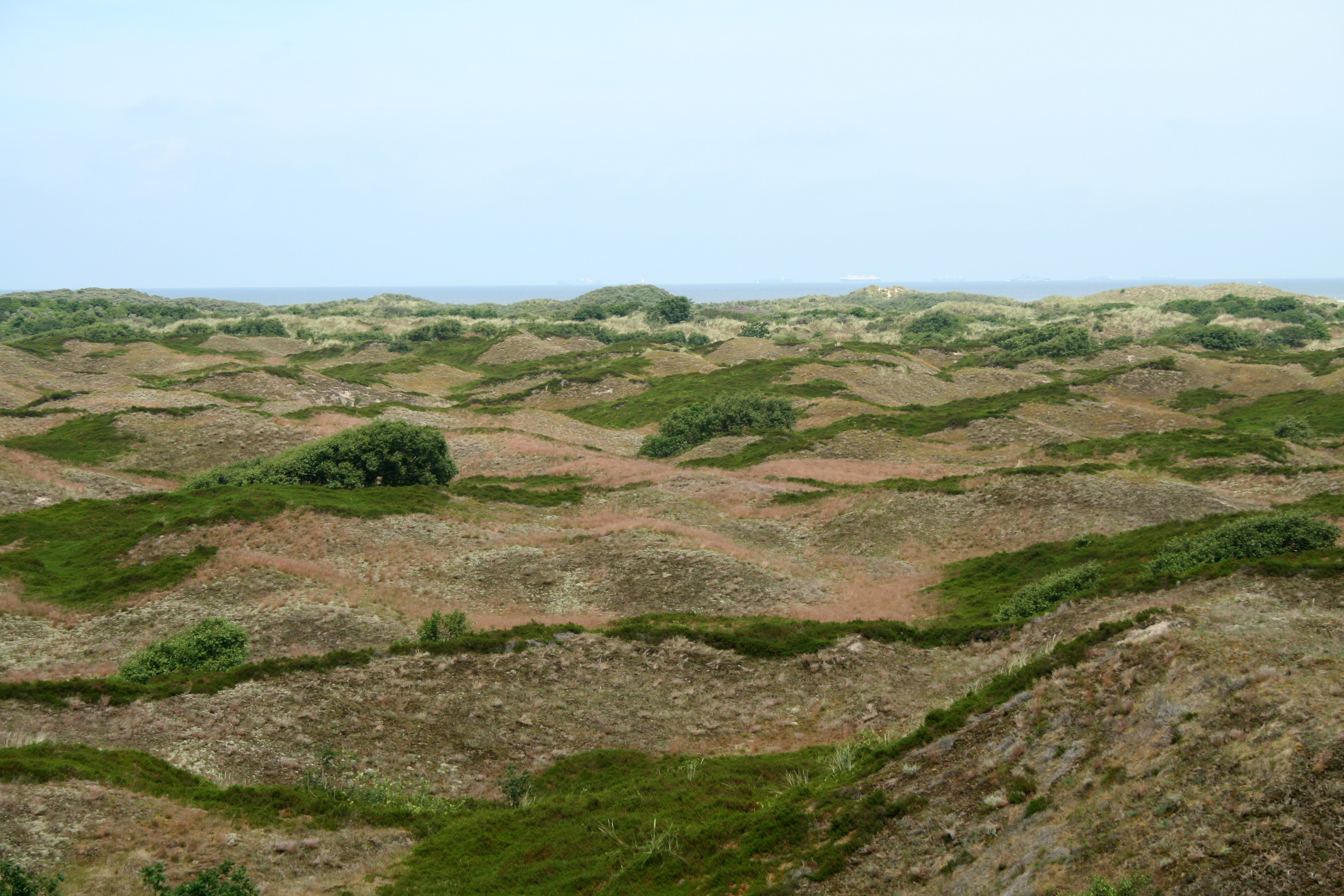
In Germany

The egg has an apple-like shape, a net-like surface and initially a white-yellow, later reddish-brown colouration. The caterpillars are brownish, yellowish or greenish and have three indistinct, double, dark dorsal lines between which black dots are recognizable. Bright lateral stripes are dorsally bounded by a series of black dots. The light brown pupa has two tips on the blunt cremaster. The larvae feed on various sand-dune plants, including Salsola kali, Cakile maritima, and Atriplex.
