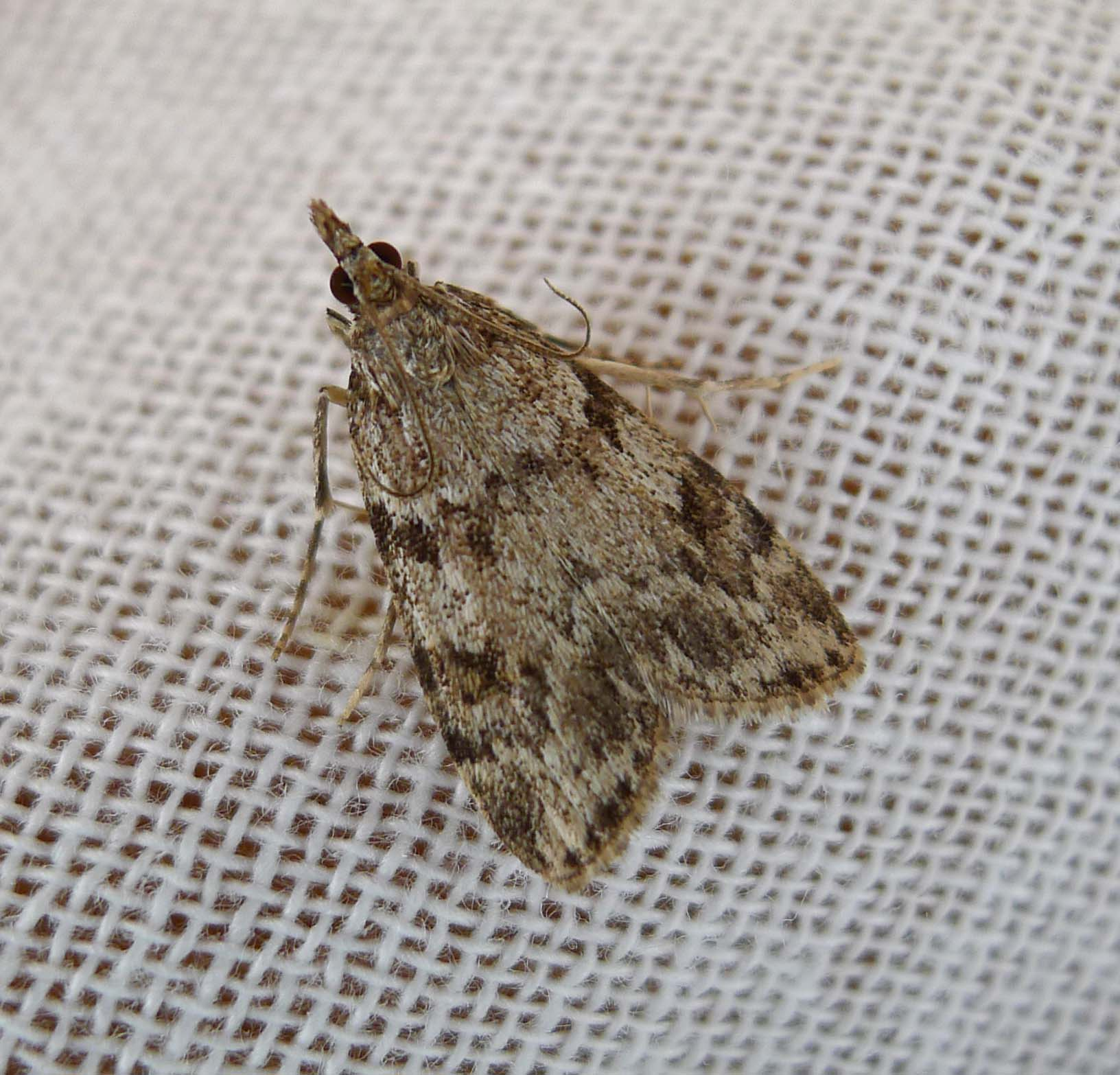

Scientific classification
- Kingdom: Animalia
- Phylum: Arthropoda
- Class: Insecta
- Order: Lepidoptera
- Family: Crambidae
- Genus: Eudonia
- Species: E. lineola

Binomial name
- Eudonia lineola (Curtis, 1827)

Synonyms
- Eudorea lineola Curtis, 1827; Eudonia lineola dorada Nuss, Karsholt & Meyer, 1998; Eudoria (Scoparia) rungsi Amsel, 1952; Scoparia virescens Rebel, 1896; Scoparia tafirella tafirella Chrétien, 1908; Scoparia coeruleotincta Hampson, 1917

= Eudonia lineola =

Species of moth

Eudonia lineola is a species of moth in the family Crambidae. It is found in Great Britain, Ireland, the Netherlands, France, Spain, Portugal and on Sardinia, the Canary Islands, as well as in North Africa, including Morocco.

== Description ==
The wingspan is 21–38 mm (0.83–1.50 in). The forewings are narrow, white or whitish, partially irrorated with black. There is a blackish mark from the base of the costa. The lines are whitish, dark-edged, the first irregular, rather oblique, the second strongly sinuate. The orbicular and claviform are black, dot-like, the latter touching the first line. The discal mark is black and X-shaped; the subterminal is thick, white and touches the second in the middle. The hindwings are whitish-grey, terminally darker with a grey discal dot. The larva is olive-green with two whitish transverse marks on each segment. The dorsal line is fine and dark; the spiracular grey. Spots, head, and plate of segment 2 are black.

== Behavior ==
They are on wing from July to August in one generation per year.

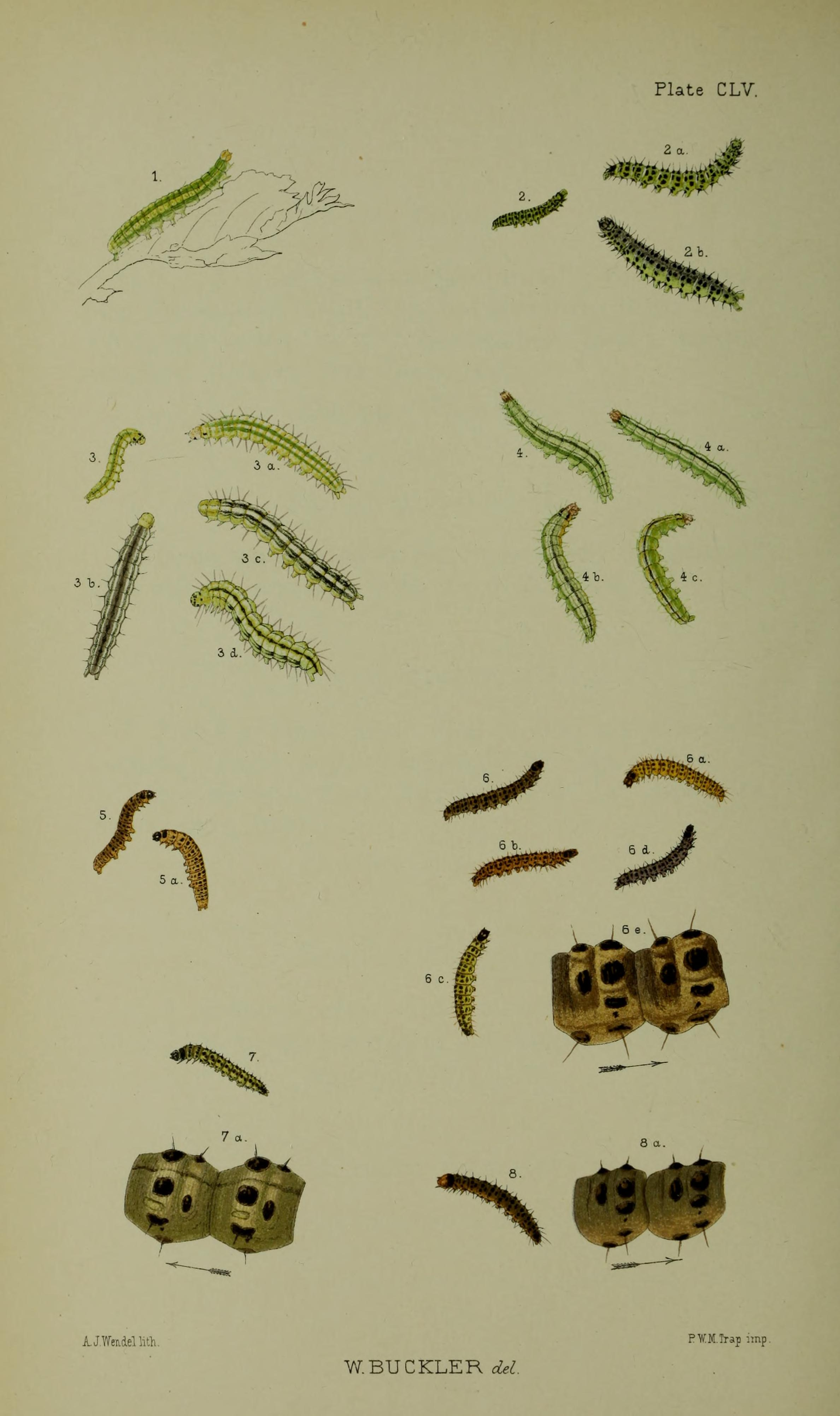
Figs. 7 larva after final moult 7a enlarged figure of two segments

The larvae feed on lichens, including Parmelia species.

== Subspecies ==
- Eudonia lineola lineola
- Eudonia lineola tafirella Chrétien, 1908 (Canary Islands)
