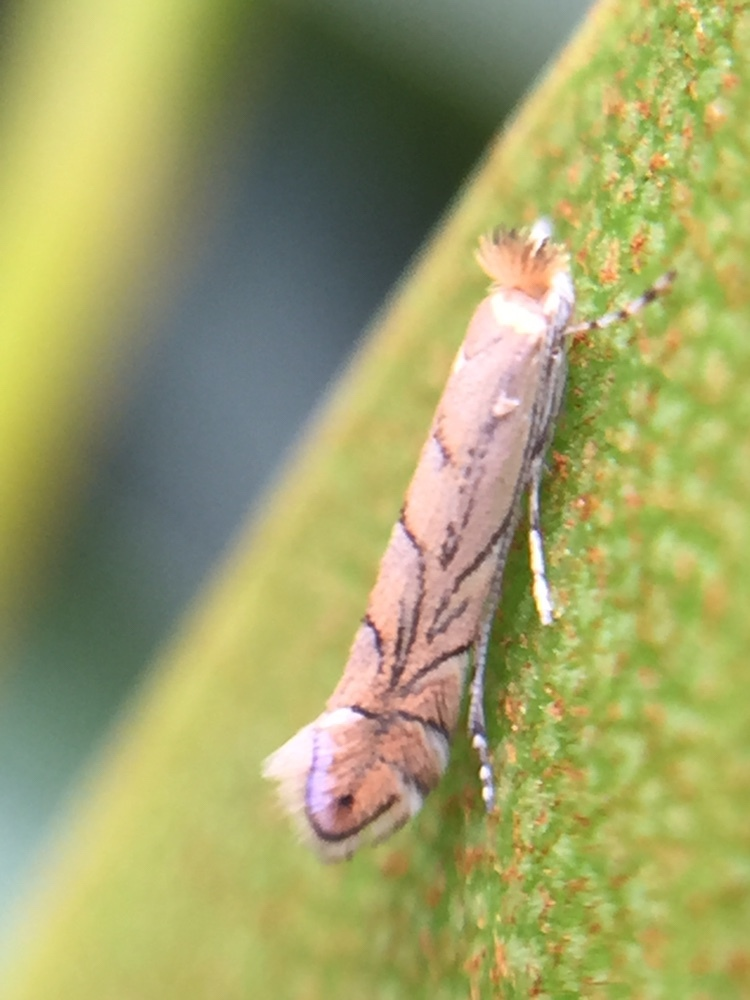

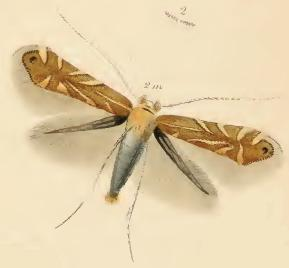

Scientific classification
- Kingdom: Animalia
- Phylum: Arthropoda
- Class: Insecta
- Order: Lepidoptera
- Family: Gracillariidae
- Genus: Phyllonorycter
- Species: P. messaniella

Binomial name
- Phyllonorycter messaniella (Zeller, 1846)

Synonyms
- Lithocolletis messaniella Zeller, 1846

= Phyllonorycter messaniella =

Species of moth

The European oak leaf-miner or Zeller's midget (Phyllonorycter messaniella) is a moth of the family Gracillariidae. It is found in Europe south of the line running from Ireland, through Great Britain, Denmark to Ukraine. It is also found in Macaronesia. It is an introduced species in New Zealand and Australia.

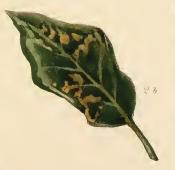
Mined leaf of evergreen oak

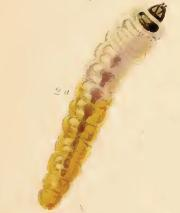
Larva

The wingspan is 7–9 mm. The forewings are light golden ochreous; a whitish dark-margined median streak from base almost to middle; four costal and three dorsal shining white wedge-shaped spots, dark-margined anteriorly and first pair except towards origin posteriorly, first dorsal very long, reaching opposite apex of second costal; a black apical dot. Hindwings are grey. The larva is yellow, paler anteriorly; dorsal line dark green; head brownish.

Adults are on wing from April to November in a number of generations.

The larvae feed on Carpinus betulus, Castanea sativa, Fagus sylvatica, Prunus, Quercus ilex, Quercus petraea, Quercus robur, Quercus suber, Quercus x turneri and Tilia species.
