= List of moths of Great Britain (micromoths) =

This is a list of microlepidoptera which are found in Great Britain. It also acts as an index to the species articles and forms part of the full List of moths of Great Britain.

== Micropterigidae ==
- Micropterix tunbergella (Fabricius, 1784)
- Micropterix mansuetella Zeller, 1844
- Micropterix aureatella (Scopoli, 1763)
- Micropterix aruncella (Scopoli, 1763)
- Micropterix calthella (Linnaeus, 1761)

== Eriocraniidae ==
- Eriocrania subpurpurella (Haworth, 1828)
- Eriocrania chrysolepidella Zeller, 1851
- Eriocrania unimaculella (Zetterstedt, 1839)
- Eriocrania sparrmannella (Bosc, 1791)
- Eriocrania salopiella (Stainton, 1854)
- Eriocrania cicatricella (Zetterstedt, 1839)
- Eriocrania sangii (Wood, 1891)
- Eriocrania semipurpurella (Stephens, 1835)

== Nepticulidae ==
- Ectoedemia decentella (Herrich-Schäffer, 1855)
- Ectoedemia sericopeza (Zeller, 1839)
- Ectoedemia louisella (Sircom, 1849)
- Ectoedemia argyropeza (Zeller, 1839)
- Ectoedemia turbidella (Zeller, 1848)
- Ectoedemia hannoverella (Glitz, 1872)
- Ectoedemia intimella (Zeller, 1848)
- Ectoedemia agrimoniae (Frey, 1858)
- Ectoedemia spinosella (de Joannis, 1908)
- Ectoedemia angulifasciella (Stainton, 1849)
- Ectoedemia atricollis (Stainton, 1857)
- Ectoedemia arcuatella (Herrich-Schäffer, 1855)
- Ectoedemia rubivora (Wocke, 1860)
- Ectoedemia erythrogenella (de Joannis, 1907)
- Ectoedemia occultella (Linnaeus, 1767)
- Ectoedemia minimella (Zetterstedt, 1839)
- Ectoedemia quinquella (Bedell, 1848)
- Ectoedemia heringella (Mariani, 1939)
- Ectoedemia albifasciella (Heinemann, 1871)
- Ectoedemia subbimaculella (Haworth, 1828)
- Ectoedemia heringi (Toll, 1934)
- Ectoedemia atrifrontella (Stainton, 1851)
- Ectoedemia septembrella (Stainton, 1849)
- Ectoedemia weaveri (Stainton, 1855)
- Bohemannia auriciliella (de Joannis, 1908)
- Bohemannia pulverosella (Stainton, 1849)
- Bohemannia quadrimaculella (Boheman, 1851)
- Trifurcula headleyella (Stainton, 1854)
- Trifurcula subnitidella (Duponchel, 1843)
- Trifurcula immundella (Zeller, 1839)
- Trifurcula beirnei Puplesis, 1984
- Trifurcula cryptella (Stainton, 1856)
- Trifurcula eurema (Tutt, 1899)
- Stigmella aurella (Fabricius, 1775)
- Stigmella splendidissimella (Herrich-Schäffer, 1855)
- Stigmella auromarginella (Richardson, 1890)
- Stigmella pretiosa (Heinemann, 1862)
- Stigmella aeneofasciella (Herrich-Schäffer, 1855)
- Stigmella dryadella (Hofmann, 1868)
- Stigmella filipendulae (Wocke, 1871)
- Stigmella poterii (Stainton, 1857)
- Stigmella tormentillella auctorum
- Stigmella lemniscella (Zeller, 1839)
- Stigmella continuella (Stainton, 1856)
- Stigmella speciosa (Frey, 1858)
- Stigmella sorbi (Stainton, 1861)
- Stigmella plagicolella (Stainton, 1854)
- Stigmella salicis (Stainton, 1854)
- Stigmella obliquella (Heinemann, 1862)
- Stigmella myrtillella (Stainton, 1857)
- Stigmella zelleriella (Snellen, 1875)
- Stigmella trimaculella (Haworth, 1828)
- Stigmella assimilella (Zeller, 1848)
- Stigmella floslactella (Haworth, 1828)
- Stigmella carpinella (Heinemann, 1862)
- Stigmella tityrella (Stainton, 1854)
- Stigmella incognitella (Herrich-Schäffer, 1855)
- Stigmella perpygmaeella (Doubleday, 1859)
- Stigmella ulmivora (Fologne, 1860)
- Stigmella hemargyrella (Kollar, 1832)
- Stigmella paradoxa (Frey, 1858)
- Stigmella atricapitella (Haworth, 1828)
- Stigmella ruficapitella (Haworth, 1828)
- Stigmella suberivora (Stainton, 1869)
- Stigmella roborella (Johansson, 1971)
- Stigmella svenssoni (Johansson, 1971)
- Stigmella samiatella (Zeller, 1839)
- Stigmella basiguttella (Heinemann, 1862)
- Stigmella tiliae (Frey, 1856)
- Stigmella minusculella (Herrich-Schäffer, 1855)
- Stigmella anomalella (Goeze, 1783) rose leaf miner
- Stigmella centifoliella (Zeller, 1848)
- Stigmella spinosissimae (Waters, 1928)
- Stigmella viscerella (Stainton, 1853)
- Stigmella ulmiphaga Preissecker
- Stigmella malella (Stainton, 1854) apple pygmy
- Stigmella catharticella (Stainton, 1853)
- Stigmella hybnerella (Hübner, 1796)
- Stigmella oxyacanthella (Stainton, 1854)
- Stigmella pyri (Glitz, 1865)
- Stigmella aceris (Frey, 1857)
- Stigmella nylandriella (Tengström, 1848)
- Stigmella magdalenae (Klimesch, 1950)
- Stigmella desperatella (Frey, 1856)
- Stigmella torminalis (Wood, 1890)
- Stigmella regiella (Herrich-Schäffer, 1855)
- Stigmella crataegella (Klimesch, 1936)
- Stigmella prunetorum (Stainton, 1855)
- Stigmella betulicola (Stainton, 1856)
- Stigmella microtheriella (Stainton, 1854)
- Stigmella luteella (Stainton, 1857)
- Stigmella sakhalinella Puplesis, 1984
- Stigmella glutinosae (Stainton, 1858)
- Stigmella alnetella (Stainton, 1856)
- Stigmella lapponica (Wocke, 1862)
- Stigmella confusella (Wood, 1894)
- Enteucha acetosae (Stainton, 1854)

== Opostegidae ==
- Opostega salaciella (Treitschke, 1833)
- Pseudopostega auritella (Hübner, 1813)
- Pseudopostega crepusculella (Zeller, 1839)
- Opostega spatulella Herrich-Schäffer, 1855

== Tischeriidae ==
- Tischeria ekebladella (Bjerkander, 1795)
- Tischeria dodonaea Stainton, 1858
- Emmetia marginea (Haworth, 1828)
- Emmetia gaunacella (Duponchel, 1843)
- Emmetia angusticollella (Duponchel, 1843)

== Incurvariidae ==
- Phylloporia bistrigella (Haworth, 1828)
- Incurvaria pectinea Haworth, 1828
- Incurvaria masculella ([Denis & Schiffermüller], 1775)
- Incurvaria oehlmanniella (Hübner, 1796)
- Incurvaria praelatella ([Denis & Schiffermüller], 1775)
- Lampronia capitella (Clerck, 1759) currant shoot borer
- Lampronia flavimitrella (Hübner, 1817)
- Lampronia luzella (Hübner, 1817)
- Lampronia corticella (Linnaeus, 1758) raspberry moth
- Lampronia morosa (Zeller, 1852)
- Lampronia fuscatella (Tengström, 1848)
- Lampronia pubicornis (Haworth, 1828)
- Nematopogon swammerdamella (Linnaeus, 1758)
- Nematopogon schwarziellus (Zeller, 1839)
- Nematopogon pilella ([Denis & Schiffermüller], 1775)
- Nematopogon metaxella (Hübner, 1813)
- Nemophora fasciella (Fabricius, 1775)
- Nemophora minimella ([Denis & Schiffermüller], 1775)
- Nemophora cupriacella (Hübner, 1819)
- Nemophora metallica (Poda, 1761)
- Nemophora degeerella (Linnaeus, 1758)
- Adela cuprella ([Denis & Schiffermüller], 1775)
- Adela reaumurella (Linnaeus, 1758)
- Adela croesella (Scopoli, 1763)
- Adela rufimitrella (Scopoli, 1763)
- Adela fibulella ([Denis & Schiffermüller], 1775)

== Heliozelidae ==
- Heliozela sericiella (Haworth, 1828)
- Heliozela resplendella (Stainton, 1851)
- Heliozela hammoniella (Sorhagen, 1885)
- Antispila metallella ([Denis & Schiffermüller], 1775)
- Antispila treitschkiella (Fischer von Röslerstamm, 1843)

== Psychidae ==
- Narycia duplicella (Goeze, 1783)
- Dahlica triquetrella (Hübner, 1813)
- Dahlica inconspicuella (Stainton, 1849) lesser lichen case-bearer
- Dahlica lichenella (Linnaeus, 1761) lichen case-bearer
- Diplodoma laichartingella (Goeze, 1783)
- Taleporia tubulosa (Retzius, 1783)
- Bankesia conspurcatella (Zeller, 1850)
- Bacotia claustrella (Bruand, 1845)
- Luffia lapidella (Goeze, 1783)
- Luffia ferchaultella (Stephens, 1850)
- Psyche casta (Pallas, 1767)
- Psyche crassiorella Bruand, 1850
- Proutia betulina (Zeller, 1839)
- Epichnopterix plumella ([Denis & Schiffermüller], 1775)
- Epichnopterix retiella (Newman, 1847)
- Acanthopsyche atra (Linnaeus, 1767)
- Pachythelia villosella (Ochsenheimer, 1810)
- Canephora hirsuta (Poda, 1761)
- Thyridopteryx ephemeraeformis (Haworth, 1803)
- Sterrhopteryx fusca (Haworth, 1809)

== Tineidae ==
- Morophaga choragella (Denis & Schiffermüller, 1775)
- Euplocamus anthracinalis (Scopoli, 1763)
- Dryadaula pactolia Meyrick, 1902
- Psychoides verhuella Bruand, 1853
- Psychoides filicivora (Meyrick, 1937)
- Tenaga nigripunctella (Haworth, 1828)
- Eudarcia richardsoni (Walsingham, 1900)
- Infurcitinea argentimaculella (Stainton, 1849)
- Infurcitinea albicomella (Stainton, 1851)
- Ischnoscia borreonella (Millière, 1874)
- Stenoptinea cyaneimarmorella (Herrich-Schäffer, 1854)
- Myrmecozela ochraceella (Tengström, 1848)
- Ateliotum insularis (Rebel, 1896)
- Setomorpha rutella Zeller, 1852 tropical tobacco moth
- Lindera tessellatella Blanchard, 1852
- Haplotinea ditella (Pierce & Metcalfe, 1938)
- Haplotinea insectella (Fabricius, 1794)
- Cephimallota crassiflavella Bruand, 1851
- Cephitinea colongella Zagulyaev, 1964
- Nemapogon granella (Linnaeus, 1758) corn moth
- Nemapogon cloacella (Haworth, 1828) cork moth
- Nemapogon wolffiella Karsholt & Nielsen, 1976
- Nemapogon variatella (Clemens, 1859)
- Nemapogon ruricolella (Stainton, 1849)
- Nemapogon clematella (Fabricius, 1781)
- Nemapogon picarella (Clerck, 1759)
- Archinemapogon yildizae Koçak, 1981
- Nemaxera betulinella (Paykull, 1785)
- Triaxomera parasitella (Hübner, 1796)
- Triaxomera fulvimitrella (Sodoffsky, 1830)
- Triaxomasia caprimulgella (Stainton, 1851)
- Monopis laevigella ([Denis & Schiffermüller], 1775) skin moth
- Monopis weaverella (Scott, 1858)
- Monopis obviella (Denis & Schiffermüller, 1775)
- Monopis crocicapitella (Clemens, 1859)
- Monopis imella (Hübner, 1813)
- Monopis monachella (Hübner, 1796)
- Monopis fenestratella (Heyden, 1863)
- Trichophaga tapetzella (Linnaeus, 1758) tapestry moth
- Trichophaga mormopis Meyrick, 1935
- Tineola bisselliella (Hummel, 1823) common clothes moth
- Niditinea fuscella (Linnaeus, 1758) brown-dotted clothes moth
- Niditinea striolella (Matsummura, 1931)
- Tinea pellionella Linnaeus, 1758 case-bearing clothes moth
- Tinea lanella Pierce & Metcalfe, 1934
- Tinea translucens Meyrick, 1917
- Tinea dubiella Stainton, 1859
- Tinea flavescentella Haworth, 1828
- Tinea pallescentella Stainton, 1851 large pale clothes moth
- Tinea semifulvella Haworth, 1828
- Tinea trinotella Thunberg, 1794
- Tenaga pomiliella Clemens, 1862
- Ceratophaga orientalis (Stainton, 1878)
- Ceratophaga haidarabadi Zagulyaev, 1966

== Ochsenheimeriidae ==
- Ochsenheimeria taurella (Denis & Schiffermüller, 1775)
- Ochsenheimeria urella Fischer von Röslerstamm, 1842
- Ochsenheimeria vacculella Fischer von Röslerstamm, 1842

== Lyonetiidae ==
- Leucoptera laburnella (Stainton, 1851) laburnum leaf miner
- Leucoptera spartifoliella (Hübner, 1813)
- Leucoptera orobi (Stainton, 1869)
- Leucoptera lathyrifoliella Stainton, 1866
- Leucoptera lotella (Stainton, 1858)
- Leucoptera malifoliella (Costa, 1836) pear leaf blister moth
- Leucoptera sinuella (Reutti, 1853)
- Lyonetia prunifoliella (Hübner, 1796)
- Lyonetia clerkella (Linnaeus, 1758) apple leaf miner
- Bedellia somnulentella (Zeller, 1847)

== Bucculatrigidae ==
- Bucculatrix cristatella (Zeller, 1839)
- Bucculatrix nigricomella (Zeller, 1839)
- Bucculatrix maritima Stainton, 1851
- Bucculatrix humiliella Herrich-Schäffer, 1855
- Bucculatrix artemisiella Herrich-Schäffer, 1855
- Bucculatrix frangutella (Goeze, 1783)
- Bucculatrix albedinella (Zeller, 1839)
- Bucculatrix cidarella Zeller, 1839
- Bucculatrix thoracella (Thunberg, 1794)
- Bucculatrix ulmella Zeller, 1848
- Bucculatrix bechsteinella (Bechstein & Scharfenberg, 1805)
- Bucculatrix demaryella (Duponchel, 1840)

== Hieroxestidae ==
- Oinophila v-flava (Haworth, 1828) yellow v moth
- Opogona sacchari (Bojer, 1856)
- Opogona omoscopa (Meyrick, 1893)
- Opogona antistacta Meyrick, 1937

== Gracillariidae ==
- Caloptilia cuculipennella (Hübner, 1796)
- Caloptilia populetorum (Zeller, 1839)
- Caloptilia elongella (Linnaeus, 1761)
- Caloptilia betulicola (Hering, 1927)
- Caloptilia rufipennella (Hübner, 1796)
- Caloptilia azaleella (Brants, 1913) azalea leaf miner
- Caloptilia alchimiella (Scopoli, 1763)
- Caloptilia robustella Jäckh, 1972
- Caloptilia stigmatella (Fabricius, 1781)
- Caloptilia falconipennella (Hübner, 1813)
- Caloptilia semifascia (Haworth, 1828)
- Caloptilia hemidactylella ([Denis & Schiffermüller], 1775)
- Caloptilia leucapennella (Stephens, 1835)
- Caloptilia syringella (Fabricius, 1794)
- Aspilapteryx tringipennella (Zeller, 1839)
- Caloptilia hauderi (Rebel, 1906)
- Calybites phasianipennella (Hübner, 1813)
- Eucalybites auroguttella (Stephens, 1835)
- Micrurapteryx kollariella (Zeller, 1839)
- Parectopa ononidis (Zeller, 1839)
- Parornix loganella (Stainton, 1848)
- Parornix betulae (Stainton, 1854)
- Parornix fagivora (Frey, 1861)
- Parornix anglicella (Stainton, 1850)
- Parornix devoniella (Stainton, 1850)
- Parornix scoticella (Stainton, 1850)
- Parornix alpicola (Wocke, 1876) (=Parornix leucostola Pelham-Clinton, 1964)
- Parornix finitimella (Zeller, 1850)
- Deltaornix torquillella (Zeller, 1850)
- Callisto denticulella (Thunberg, 1794)
- Dialectica imperialella (Zeller, 1847)
- Acrocercops brongniardella (Fabricius, 1798)
- Leucospilapteryx omissella (Stainton, 1848)
- Phyllonorycter harrisella (Linnaeus, 1761)
- Phyllonorycter roboris (Zeller, 1839)
- Phyllonorycter heegeriella (Zeller, 1846)
- Phyllonorycter tenerella (de Joannis, 1915)
- Phyllonorycter kuhlweiniella (Zeller, 1839)
- Phyllonorycter quercifoliella (Zeller, 1839)
- Phyllonorycter messaniella (Zeller, 1846)
- Phyllonorycter platani (Staudinger, 1870)
- Phyllonorycter muelleriella (Zeller, 1839)
- Phyllonorycter oxyacanthae (Frey, 1856)
- Phyllonorycter sorbi (Frey, 1855)
- Phyllonorycter mespilella (Hübner, 1805)
- Phyllonorycter blancardella Fabricius, 1781
- Phyllonorycter hostis Triberti, 2007
- Phyllonorycter junoniella (Zeller, 1846)
- Phyllonorycter spinicolella (Zeller, 1846)
- Phyllonorycter cerasicolella (Herrich-Schäffer, 1855)
- Phyllonorycter lantanella (Schrank, 1802)
- Phyllonorycter corylifoliella (Hübner, 1796)
- Phyllonorycter leucographella (Zeller, 1850) firethorn leaf miner
- Phyllonorycter salictella viminiella (Zeller, 1846)
- Phyllonorycter viminetorum (Stainton, 1854)
- Phyllonorycter salicicolella (Sircom, 1848)
- Phyllonorycter dubitella (Herrich-Schäffer, 1855)
- Phyllonorycter hilarella (Zetterstedt, 1839)
- Phyllonorycter cavella (Zeller, 1846)
- Phyllonorycter ulicicolella (Stainton, 1851)
- Phyllonorycter scopariella (Zeller, 1846)
- Phyllonorycter maestingella (Müller, 1764)
- Phyllonorycter coryli (Nicelli, 1851) nut leaf blister moth
- Phyllonorycter esperella Goeze, 1783
- Phyllonorycter strigulatella (Lienig & Zeller, 1846)
- Phyllonorycter rajella (Linnaeus, 1758)
- Phyllonorycter distentella (Zeller, 1846)
- Phyllonorycter anderidae (W. Fletcher, 1885)
- Phyllonorycter quinqueguttella (Stainton, 1851)
- Phyllonorycter nigrescentella (Logan, 1851)
- Phyllonorycter insignitella (Zeller, 1846)
- Phyllonorycter lautella (Zeller, 1846)
- Phyllonorycter schreberella Fabricius, 1781
- Phyllonorycter ulmifoliella (Hübner, 1817)
- Phyllonorycter emberizaepenella (Bouché, 1834)
- Phyllonorycter scabiosella (Douglas, 1853)
- Phyllonorycter tristrigella (Haworth, 1828)
- Phyllonorycter stettinensis (Nicelli, 1852)
- Phyllonorycter froelichiella (Zeller, 1839)
- Phyllonorycter nicellii (Stainton, 1851)
- Phyllonorycter kleemannella (Fabricius, 1781)
- Phyllonorycter trifasciella (Haworth, 1828)
- Phyllonorycter acerifoliella (Zeller, 1839)
- Phyllonorycter platanoidella (de Joannis, 1920)
- Phyllonorycter geniculella (Ragonot, 1874)
- Phyllonorycter comparella (Duponchel, 1843)
- Phyllonorycter sagitella (Bjerkander, 1790)
- Cameraria ohridella (Deschka & Dimic, 1986) horse chestnut leaf-miner

== Phyllocnistidae ==
- Phyllocnistis saligna (Zeller, 1839)
- Phyllocnistis unipunctella (Stephens, 1834)
- Phyllocnistis xenia Hering, 1936

== Choreutidae ==
- Anthophila fabriciana (Linnaeus, 1767)
- Tebenna micalis (Mann, 1857)
- Prochoreutis sehestediana (Fabricius, 1776)
- Prochoreutis myllerana (Fabricius, 1794)
- Choreutis pariana (Clerck, 1759) apple leaf skeletonizer
- Choreutis diana (Hübner, 1822)

== Glyphipterigidae ==
- Glyphipterix simpliciella (Stephens, 1834) cocksfoot moth
- Glyphipterix schoenicolella Boyd, 1858
- Glyphipterix equitella (Scopoli, 1763)
- Glyphipterix forsterella (Fabricius, 1781)
- Glyphipterix haworthana (Stephens, 1834)
- Glyphipterix fuscoviridella (Haworth, 1828)
- Glyphipterix thrasonella (Scopoli, 1763)

== Douglasiidae ==
- Tinagma ocnerostomella (Stainton, 1850)
- Tinagma balteolella (Fischer von Röslerstamm, 1840)
- Heliodines roesella (Linnaeus, 1758)

== Yponomeutidae ==
- Argyresthia laevigatella (Heydenreich, 1851)
- Argyresthia illuminatella Zeller
- Argyresthia glabratella (Zeller, 1847)
- Argyresthia praecocella (Zeller, 1839)
- Argyresthia arceuthina (Zeller, 1839)
- Argyresthia abdominalis (Zeller, 1839)
- Argyresthia dilectella (Zeller, 1847)
- Argyresthia aurulentella Stainton, 1849
- Argyresthia ivella (Haworth, 1828)
- Argyresthia trifasciata Staudinger, 1871
- Argyresthia cupressella Walsingham, 1890
- Argyresthia brockeella (Hübner, 1813)
- Argyresthia goedartella (Linnaeus, 1758)
- Argyresthia pygmaeella ([Denis & Schiffermüller], 1775)
- Argyresthia sorbiella (Treitschke, 1833)
- Argyresthia curvella (Linnaeus, 1761)
- Argyresthia retinella Zeller, 1839
- Argyresthia glaucinella Zeller, 1839
- Argyresthia spinosella Stainton, 1849
- Argyresthia conjugella Zeller, 1839 apple fruit moth
- Argyresthia semifusca (Haworth, 1828)
- Argyresthia pruniella (Clerck, 1759) cherry fruit moth
- Argyresthia bonnetella (Linnaeus, 1758)
- Argyresthia albistria (Haworth, 1828)
- Argyresthia semitestacella (Curtis, 1833)
- Yponomeuta evonymella (Linnaeus, 1758) bird-cherry ermine
- Yponomeuta padella (Linnaeus, 1758) orchard ermine
- Yponomeuta malinellus Zeller, 1838 apple ermine
- Yponomeuta cagnagella (Hübner, 1813) spindle ermine
- Yponomeuta rorrella (Hübner, 1796) willow ermine
- Yponomeuta irrorella (Hübner, 1796)
- Yponomeuta plumbella ([Denis & Schiffermüller], 1775)
- Yponomeuta sedella Treitschke, 1832
- Euhyponomeuta stannella (Thunberg, 1794)
- Kessleria fasciapennella (Stainton, 1849)
- Kessleria saxifragae (Stainton, 1868)
- Zelleria hepariella Stainton, 1849
- Pseudoswammerdamia combinella (Hübner, 1786)
- Swammerdamia caesiella (Hübner, 1796)
- Swammerdamia passerella (Zetterstedt, 1839)
- Swammerdamia pyrella (Villers, 1789)
- Swammerdamia compunctella (Herrich-Schäffer, 1855)
- Paraswammerdamia albicapitella (Scharfenberg, 1805)
- Paraswammerdamia nebulella (Goeze, 1783)
- Cedestis gysseleniella Zeller, 1839
- Cedestis subfasciella (Stephens, 1834)
- Ocnerostoma piniariella Zeller, 1847
- Ocnerostoma friesei Svensson, 1966
- Roeslerstammia pronubella ([Denis & Schiffermüller], 1775)
- Roeslerstammia erxlebella (Fabricius, 1787)
- Atemelia torquatella (Lienig & Zeller, 1846)
- Prays fraxinella (Bjerkander, 1784) ash bud moth
- Prays citri (Milliére, 1873)
- Prays peregrina Agassiz, 2007
- Scythropia crataegella (Linnaeus, 1767) hawthorn moth
- Ypsolopha mucronella (Scopoli, 1763)
- Ypsolopha nemorella (Linnaeus, 1758)
- Ypsolopha dentella (Fabricius, 1775) honeysuckle moth
- Ypsolopha asperella (Linnaeus, 1761)
- Ypsolopha scabrella (Linnaeus, 1761)
- Ypsolopha horridella (Treitschke, 1835)
- Ypsolopha lucella (Fabricius, 1775)
- Ypsolopha alpella ([Denis & Schiffermüller], 1775)
- Ypsolopha sylvella (Linnaeus, 1767)
- Ypsolopha parenthesella (Linnaeus, 1761)
- Ypsolopha ustella (Clerck, 1759)
- Ypsolopha sequella (Clerck, 1759)
- Ypsolopha vittella (Linnaeus, 1758)
- Plutella xylostella (Linnaeus, 1758) diamond-back moth
- Plutella porrectella (Linnaeus, 1758)
- Rhigognostis senilella (Zetterstedt, 1839)
- Rhigognostis annulatella (Curtis, 1832)
- Rhigognostis incarnatella (Steudel, 1873)
- Eidophasia messingiella (Fischer von Röslerstamm, 1840)
- Orthotelia sparganella (Thunberg, 1788)
- Digitivalva perlepidella (Stainton, 1849)
- Digitivalva pulicariae Klimesch, 1956
- Acrolepiopsis assectella (Zeller, 1839) leek moth
- Acrolepiopsis betulella (Curtis, 1838)
- Acrolepiopsis marcidella (Curtis, 1850)
- Acrolepia autumnitella Curtis, 1838

== Epermeniidae ==
- Phaulernis dentella (Zeller, 1839)
- Phaulernis fulviguttella (Zeller, 1839)
- Epermenia farreni (Walsingham, 1894)
- Epermenia profugella (Stainton, 1856)
- Epermenia falciformis (Haworth, 1828)
- Epermenia insecurella (Stainton, 1849)
- Epermenia chaerophyllella (Goeze, 1783)
- Epermenia aequidentellus (Hofmann, 1867)

== Schreckensteiniidae ==
- Schreckensteinia festaliella (Hübner, 1819)

== Coleophoridae ==
- Augasma aeratella (Zeller, 1839)
- Metriotes lutarea (Haworth, 1828)
- Goniodoma limoniella (Stainton, 1884)
- Coleophora albella (Thunberg, 1788)
- Coleophora lutipennella (Zeller, 1838)
- Coleophora gryphipennella (Hübner, 1796)
- Coleophora flavipennella (Duponchel, 1843)
- Coleophora serratella (Linnaeus, 1761)
- Coleophora coracipennella (Hübner, 1796)
- Coleophora prunifoliae Doets, 1944
- Coleophora spinella (Schrank, 1802) apple and plum case-bearer
- Coleophora milvipennis (Zeller, 1839)
- Coleophora badiipennella (Duponchel, 1843)
- Coleophora alnifoliae Barasch, 1934
- Coleophora limosipennella (Duponchel, 1843)
- Coleophora hydrolapathella Hering, 1921
- Coleophora siccifolia Stainton, 1856
- Coleophora trigeminella Fuchs, 1881
- Coleophora fuscocuprella Herrich-Schäffer, 1885
- Coleophora lusciniaepennella (Treitschke, 1833)
- Coleophora idaeella Hofmann, 1869
- Coleophora vitisella Gregson, 1856
- Coleophora glitzella Hofmann, 1869
- Coleophora arctostaphyli Meder, 1933
- Coleophora violacea (Ström, 1783)
- Coleophora juncicolella Stainton, 1851
- Coleophora orbitella Zeller, 1849
- Coleophora binderella (Kollar, 1832)
- Coleophora potentillae Elisha, 1885
- Coleophora ahenella Heinemann, 1876
- Coleophora albitarsella Zeller, 1849
- Coleophora trifolii (Curtis, 1832) large clover case-bearer
- Coleophora alcyonipennella (Kollar, 1832) clover case-bearer
- Coleophora mayrella (Hübner, 1813)
- Coleophora deauratella Lienig & Zeller, 1846
- Coleophora amethystinella Ragonot, 1885
- Coleophora conyzae Zeller, 1868
- Coleophora lineolea (Haworth, 1828)
- Coleophora hemerobiella (Scopoli, 1763)
- Coleophora lithargyrinella Zeller, 1849
- Coleophora solitariella Zeller, 1849
- Coleophora laricella (Hübner, 1817) larch case-bearer
- Coleophora wockeella Zeller, 1849
- Coleophora chalcogrammella Zeller, 1849
- Coleophora tricolor Walsingham, 1899
- Coleophora lixella Zeller, 1849
- Coleophora ochrea (Haworth, 1828)
- Coleophora albidella ([Denis & Schiffermüller], 1775)
- Coleophora anatipennella (Hübner, 1796) pistol case-bearer
- Coleophora currucipennella Zeller, 1839
- Coleophora ibipennella Zeller, 1849
- Coleophora betulella Heinemann, 1876
- Coleophora palliatella (Goeze, 1783)
- Coleophora vibicella (Hübner, 1813)
- Coleophora conspicuella Zeller, 1849
- Coleophora vibicigerella Zeller, 1839
- Coleophora pyrrhulipennella Zeller, 1839
- Coleophora serpylletorum Hering, 1889
- Coleophora vulnerariae Zeller, 1839
- Coleophora albicosta (Haworth, 1828)
- Coleophora saturatella Stainton, 1850
- Coleophora genistae Stainton, 1857
- Coleophora discordella Zeller, 1849
- Coleophora niveicostella Zeller, 1849
- Coleophora pennella (Denis & Schiffermüller, 1775)
- Coleophora silenella Herrich-Schäffer, 1855
- Coleophora galbulipennella Zeller, 1838
- Coleophora lassella Staudinger, 1859
- Coleophora striatipennella Nylander, 1848
- Coleophora inulae Wocke, 1876
- Coleophora follicularis (Vallot, 1802)
- Coleophora trochilella (Duponchel, 1843)
- Coleophora gardesanella Toll, 1953
- Coleophora ramosella Zeller, 1849
- Coleophora peribenanderi Toll, 1943
- Coleophora paripennella Zeller, 1839
- Coleophora therinella Tengström, 1848
- Coleophora asteris Mühlig, 1864
- Coleophora argentula (Stephens, 1834)
- Coleophora virgaureae Stainton, 1857
- Coleophora saxicolella Duponchel, 1843
- Coleophora sternipennella (Zetterstedt, 1839)
- Coleophora adspersella Benander, 1939
- Coleophora versurella Zeller, 1849
- Coleophora squamosella Stainton, 1856
- Coleophora pappiferella Hofmann, 1869
- Coleophora granulatella Zeller
- Coleophora vestianella (Linnaeus, 1758)
- Coleophora atriplicis Meyrick, 1928
- Coleophora deviella Zeller, 1847
- Coleophora salinella Stainton, 1859
- Coleophora artemisiella Scott, 1861
- Coleophora artemisicolella Bruand, 1855
- Coleophora otidipennella (Hübner, 1817)
- Coleophora antennariella Herrich-Schäffer, 1861
- Coleophora sylvaticella Wood, 1892
- Coleophora taeniipennella Herrich-Schäffer, 1855
- Coleophora glaucicolella Wood, 1892
- Coleophora tamesis Waters, 1929
- Coleophora alticolella Zeller, 1849
- Coleophora maritimella Newman, 1873
- Coleophora adjunctella Hodgkinson, 1882
- Coleophora caespititiella Zeller, 1839
- Coleophora salicorniae Heinemann & Wocke, 1876
- Coleophora clypeiferella Hofmann, 1871

== Elachistidae ==
- Perittia obscurepunctella (Stainton, 1848)
- Mendesia farinella (Thunberg, 1794)
- Stephensia brunnichella (Linnaeus, 1767)
- Elachista regificella Sircom, 1849
- Elachista gleichenella (Fabricius, 1781)
- Elachista biatomella (Stainton, 1848)
- Elachista poae Stainton, 1855
- Elachista atricomella Stainton, 1849
- Elachista kilmunella Stainton, 1849
- Elachista alpinella Stainton, 1854
- Elachista luticomella Zeller, 1839
- Elachista albifrontella (Hübner, 1817)
- Elachista apicipunctella Stainton, 1849
- Elachista subnigrella Douglas, 1853
- Elachista orstadii Palm, 1943
- Elachista eskoi Kyrki & Karvonen, 1985
- Elachista pomerana Frey, 1870
- Elachista occultella Douglas, 1850
- Elachista canapennella (Hübner, 1813)
- Elachista rufocinerea (Haworth, 1828)
- Elachista maculicerusella Bruand, 1859
- Elachista argentella (Clerck, 1759)
- Elachista triatomea (Haworth, 1828)
- Elachista collitella (Duponchel, 1843)
- Elachista subocellea (Stephens, 1834)
- Elachista triseriatella Stainton, 1854
- Elachista cahorsensis Traugott-Olsen, 1992
- Elachista bedellella (Sircom, 1848)
- Elachista obliquella Stainton, 1854
- Elachista cingillella (Herrich-Schäffer, 1855)
- Elachista unifasciella (Haworth, 1828)
- Elachista gangabella Zeller, 1850
- Elachista subalbidella Schläger, 1847
- Elachista adscitella Stainton, 1851
- Elachista bisulcella (Duponchel, 1843)
- Biselachista trapeziella (Stainton, 1849)
- Biselachista cinereopunctella (Haworth, 1828)
- Biselachista serricornis (Stainton, 1854)
- Biselachista scirpi (Stainton, 1887)
- Biselachista eleochariella (Stainton, 1851)
- Biselachista utonella (Frey, 1856)
- Biselachista albidella (Nylander, 1847)
- Cosmiotes freyerella (Hübner, 1825)
- Cosmiotes consortella (Stainton, 1851)
- Cosmiotes stabilella (Stainton, 1858)

== Oecophoridae ==
- Schiffermuellerina grandis (Desvignes, 1842)
- Denisia subaquilea (Stainton, 1849)
- Denisia similella (Hübner, 1796)
- Crassa tinctella (Hübner, 1796)
- Denisia augustella (Hübner, 1796)
- Denisia albimaculea (Haworth, 1828)
- Bisigna procerella ([Denis & Schiffermüller], 1775)
- Batia lunaris (Haworth, 1828)
- Batia lambdella (Donovan, 1793)
- Batia unitella (Hübner, 1796)
- Metalampra italica Baldizzone, 1977
- Epicallima formosella ([Denis & Schiffermüller], 1775)
- Borkhausenia fuscescens (Haworth, 1828)
- Borkhausenia minutella (Linnaeus, 1758)
- Telechrysis tripuncta (Haworth, 1828)
- Hofmannophila pseudospretella (Stainton, 1849) brown house-moth
- Endrosis sarcitrella (Linnaeus, 1758) white-shouldered house-moth
- Esperia sulphurella (Fabricius, 1775)
- Esperia oliviella (Fabricius, 1794)
- Oecophora bractella (Linnaeus, 1758)
- Alabonia geoffrella (Linnaeus, 1767)
- Aplota palpella (Haworth, 1828)
- Pleurota bicostella (Clerck, 1759)
- Pleurota aristella (Linnaeus, 1758)
- Tachystola acroxantha (Meyrick, 1885)
- Hypercallia citrinalis Scopoli, 1763
- Carcina quercana (Fabricius, 1775)
- Amphisbatis incongruella (Stainton, 1849)
- Pseudatemelia josephinae (Toll, 1956)
- Pseudatemelia flavifrontella ([Denis & Schiffermüller], 1775)
- Pseudatemelia subochreella (Doubleday, 1859)
- Diurnea fagella ([Denis & Schiffermüller], 1775)
- Diurnea lipsiella ([Denis & Schiffermüller], 1775)
- Dasystoma salicella (Hübner, 1796)
- Semioscopis avellanella (Hübner, 1793)
- Semioscopis steinkellneriana ([Denis & Schiffermüller], 1775)
- Luquetia lobella ([Denis & Schiffermüller], 1775)
- Depressaria discipunctella (Herrich-Schäffer, 1854)
- Depressaria daucella ([Denis & Schiffermüller], 1775)
- Depressaria ultimella Stainton, 1849
- Depressaria heraclei (Retzius, 1783) parsnip moth
- Depressaria pimpinellae Zeller, 1839
- Depressaria badiella (Hübner, 1796)
- Depressaria pulcherrimella Stainton, 1849
- Depressaria douglasella Stainton, 1849
- Depressaria sordidatella Tengström, 1848
- Depressaria emeritella Stainton, 1849
- Depressaria albipunctella (Denis & Schiffermüller, 1775)
- Depressaria olerella Zeller, 1854
- Depressaria chaerophylli Zeller, 1839
- Depressaria depressana (Fabricius, 1775)
- Depressaria silesiaca Heinemann, 1870
- Levipalpus hepatariella (Lienig & Zeller, 1846)
- Exaeretia ciniflonella (Lienig & Zeller, 1846)
- Exaeretia allisella Stainton, 1849
- Agonopterix heracliana (Linnaeus, 1758)
- Agonopterix ciliella (Stainton, 1849)
- Agonopterix cnicella (Treitschke, 1832)
- Agonopterix purpurea (Haworth, 1811)
- Agonopterix subpropinquella (Stainton, 1849)
- Agonopterix putridella ([Denis & Schiffermüller], 1775)
- Agonopterix nanatella (Stainton, 1849)
- Agonopterix alstromeriana (Clerck, 1759)
- Agonopterix propinquella (Treitschke, 1835)
- Agonopterix arenella ([Denis & Schiffermüller], 1775)
- Agonopterix kaekeritziana (Linnaeus, 1767)
- Agonopterix bipunctosa (Curtis, 1850)
- Agonopterix pallorella (Zeller, 1839)
- Agonopterix ocellana (Fabricius, 1775)
- Agonopterix assimilella (Treitschke, 1832)
- Agonopterix atomella ([Denis & Schiffermüller], 1775)
- Agonopterix scopariella (Heinemann, 1870)
- Agonopterix umbellana (Fabricius, 1794)
- Agonopterix nervosa (Haworth, 1811)
- Agonopterix carduella (Hübner, 1817)
- Agonopterix liturosa Bradley, 1966
- Agonopterix conterminella (Zeller, 1839)
- Agonopterix curvipunctosa (Haworth, 1811)
- Agonopterix astrantiae (Heinemann, 1870)
- Agonopterix angelicella (Hübner, 1813)
- Agonopterix yeatiana (Fabricius, 1781)
- Agonopterix capreolella (Zeller, 1839)
- Agonopterix rotundella (Douglas, 1846)

== Ethmiidae ==
- Ethmia terminella T. B. Fletcher, 1938
- Ethmia dodecea (Haworth, 1828)
- Ethmia quadrillella (Goeze, 1783)
- Ethmia bipunctella (Fabricius, 1775)
- Ethmia pusiella (Linnaeus, 1758)
- Ethmia pyrausta (Pallas, 1771)

== Gelechiidae ==
- Metzneria littorella (Douglas, 1850)
- Metzneria lappella (Linnaeus, 1758)
- Metzneria aestivella (Zeller, 1839)
- Metzneria metzneriella (Stainton, 1851)
- Metzneria neuropterella (Zeller, 1839)
- Metzneria aprilella (Herrich-Schäffer, 1854)
- Monochroa cytisella (Curtis, 1837)
- Isophrictis striatella ([Denis & Schiffermüller], 1775)
- Apodia bifractella (Duponchel, 1843)
- Eulamprotes atrella ([Denis & Schiffermüller], 1775)
- Eulamprotes immaculatella (Douglas, 1850)
- Eulamprotes unicolorella (Duponchel, 1843)
- Eulamprotes wilkella (Linnaeus, 1758)
- Argolamprotes micella ([Denis & Schiffermüller], 1775)
- Monochroa tenebrella (Hübner, 1817)
- Monochroa lucidella (Stephens, 1834)
- Monochroa palustrella (Douglas, 1850)
- Monochroa tetragonella (Stainton, 1885)
- Monochroa conspersella (Herrich-Schäffer, 1854)
- Monochroa hornigi (Staudinger, 1883)
- Monochroa suffusella (Douglas, 1850)
- Monochroa lutulentella (Zeller, 1839)
- Monochroa elongella (Heinemann, 1870)
- Monochroa arundinetella (Stainton, 1858)
- Monochroa divisella (Douglas, 1850)
- Monochroa niphognatha (Gozmány, 1953)
- Chrysoesthia drurella (Fabricius, 1775)
- Chrysoesthia sexguttella (Thunberg, 1794)
- Ptocheuusa paupella (Zeller, 1847)
- Sitotroga cerealella (Olivier, 1789) Angoumois grain moth
- Psamathocrita osseella (Stainton, 1861)
- Aristotelia subdecurtella (Stainton, 1859)
- Aristotelia ericinella (Zeller, 1839)
- Aristotelia brizella (Treitschke, 1833)
- Xystophora pulveratella (Herrich-Schäffer, 1854)
- Stenolechia gemmella (Linnaeus, 1758)
- Parachronistis albiceps (Zeller, 1839)
- Recurvaria nanella ([Denis & Schiffermüller], 1775)
- Recurvaria leucatella (Clerck, 1759)
- Coleotechnites piceaella (Kearfott, 1903)
- Exoteleia dodecella (Linnaeus, 1758)
- Athrips tetrapunctella (Thunberg, 1794)
- Athrips mouffetella (Linnaeus, 1758)
- Xenolechia aethiops (Humphreys & Westwood, 1845)
- Pseudotelphusa scalella (Scopoli, 1763)
- Teleiodes vulgella ([Denis & Schiffermüller], 1775)
- Altenia scriptella (Hübner, 1796)
- Carpatolechia decorella (Haworth, 1812)
- Carpatolechia notatella (Hübner, 1813)
- Teleiodes wagae (Nowicki, 1860)
- Carpatolechia proximella (Hübner, 1796)
- Carpatolechia alburnella (Zeller, 1839)
- Carpatolechia fugitivella (Zeller, 1839)
- Pseudotelphusa paripunctella (Thunberg, 1794)
- Teleiodes luculella (Hübner, 1813)
- Teleiodes sequax (Haworth, 1828)
- Teleiopsis diffinis (Haworth, 1828)
- Bryotropha basaltinella (Zeller, 1839)
- Bryotropha dryadella (Zeller, 1850)
- Bryotropha umbrosella (Zeller, 1839)
- Bryotropha affinis (Haworth, 1828)
- Bryotropha similis (Stainton, 1854)
- Bryotropha mundella (Douglas, 1850)
- Bryotropha senectella (Zeller, 1839)
- Bryotropha boreella (Douglas, 1851)
- Bryotropha galbanella (Zeller, 1839)
- Bryotropha figulella (Staudinger, 1859)
- Bryotropha desertella (Douglas, 1850)
- Bryotropha terrella ([Denis & Schiffermüller], 1775)
- Bryotropha politella (Stainton, 1851)
- Bryotropha domestica (Haworth, 1828)
- Chionodes fumatella (Douglas, 1850)
- Chionodes distinctella (Zeller, 1839)
- Mirificarma mulinella (Zeller, 1839)
- Mirificarma lentiginosella (Zeller, 1839)
- Prolita sexpunctella (Fabricius, 1794)
- Prolita solutella (Zeller, 1839)
- Gelechia muscosella Zeller, 1839
- Gelechia cuneatella Douglas, 1852
- Gelechia hippophaella (Schrank, 1802)
- Gelechia nigra (Haworth, 1828)
- Gelechia turpella ([Denis & Schiffermüller], 1775)
- Aroga velocella (Zeller, 1839)
- Neofaculta ericetella (Geyer, 1832)
- Neofriseria peliella (Treitschke, 1835)
- Neofriseria singula (Staudinger, 1876)
- Gelechia rhombella ([Denis & Schiffermüller], 1775)
- Gelechia scotinella Herrich-Schäffer, 1854
- Gelechia senticetella (Staudinger, 1859)
- Gelechia sabinellus (Zeller, 1839)
- Gelechia sororculella (Hübner, 1817)
- Platyedra subcinerea (Haworth, 1828)
- Pexicopia malvella (Hübner, 1805) hollyhock seed moth
- Scrobipalpa suaedella (Richardson, 1893)
- Scrobipalpa samadensis (Stainton, 1883)
- Scrobipalpa instabilella (Douglas, 1846)
- Scrobipalpa salinella (Zeller, 1847)
- Scrobipalpa ocellatella (Boyd, 1858) beet moth
- Scrobipalpa nitentella (Fuchs, 1902)
- Scrobipalpa obsoletella (Fischer von Röslerstamm, 1841)
- Scrobipalpa clintoni Povolny, 1968
- Scrobipalpa atriplicella (Fischer von Röslerstamm, 1841)
- Scrobipalpa costella (Humphreys & Westwood, 1845)
- Scrobipalpa artemisiella (Treitschke, 1833) thyme moth
- Scrobipalpa murinella (Duponchel, 1843)
- Scrobipalpa acuminatella (Sircom, 1850)
- Scrobipalpula diffluella (Frey, 1870)
- Scrobipalpula tussilaginis (Stainton, 1867)
- Gnorimoschema streliciella (Herrich-Schäffer, 1854)
- Phthorimaea operculella (Zeller, 1873) potato tuber moth
- Caryocolum vicinella (Douglas, 1851)
- Caryocolum alsinella (Zeller, 1868)
- Caryocolum viscariella (Stainton, 1855)
- Caryocolum marmoreum (Haworth, 1828)
- Caryocolum fraternella (Douglas, 1851)
- Caryocolum proximum (Haworth, 1828)
- Caryocolum blandella (Douglas, 1852)
- Caryocolum junctella (Douglas, 1851)
- Caryocolum tricolorella (Haworth, 1812)
- Caryocolum blandulella (Tutt, 1887)
- Caryocolum kroesmanniella (Herrich-Schäffer, 1854)
- Caryocolum huebneri (Haworth, 1827)
- Nothris verbascella (Hübner, 1813)
- Nothris congressariella (Bruand, 1858)
- Thiotricha subocellea (Stephens, 1834)
- Sophronia semicostella (Hübner, 1813)
- Sophronia humerella ([Denis & Schiffermüller], 1775)
- Aproaerema anthyllidella (Hübner, 1813)
- Syncopacma larseniella (Gozmany, 1957)
- Syncopacma sangiella (Stainton, 1863)
- Syncopacma vinella (Bankes, 1898)
- Syncopacma taeniolella (Zeller, 1839)
- Syncopacma albipalpella (Herrich-Schäffer, 1854)
- Syncopacma cinctella (Clerck, 1759)
- Syncopacma polychromella (Rebel, 1902)
- Dichomeris alacella (Zeller, 1839)
- Anacampsis temerella (Lienig & Zeller, 1846)
- Anacampsis populella (Clerck, 1759)
- Anacampsis blattariella (Hübner, 1796)
- Acompsia cinerella (Clerck, 1759)
- Anarsia spartiella (Schrank, 1802)
- Anarsia lineatella Zeller, 1839 peach twig borer
- Hypatima rhomboidella (Linnaeus, 1758)
- Psoricoptera gibbosella (Zeller, 1839)
- Mesophleps silacella (Hübner, 1796)
- Acompsia schmidtiellus (Heyden, 1848)
- Dichomeris marginella (Fabricius, 1781) juniper webber
- Dichomeris juniperella (Linnaeus, 1761)
- Dichomeris ustalella (Fabricius, 1794)
- Dichomeris derasella ([Denis & Schiffermüller], 1775)
- Brachmia blandella (Fabricius, 1798)
- Brachmia inornatella (Douglas, 1850)
- Helcystogramma rufescens (Haworth, 1828)
- Helcystogramma lutatella (Herrich-Schäffer, 1854)
- Oegoconia quadripuncta (Haworth, 1828)
- Oegoconia deauratella (Herrich-Schäffer, 1854)
- Oegoconia caradjai Popescu-Gorg & Capuse, 1965
- Symmoca signatella Herrich-Schäffer, 1854

== Blastobasidae ==
- Blastobasis adustella Walsingham, 1894
- Blastobasis lacticolella (Wollaston, 1858)
- Blastobasis phycidella (Zeller, 1839)
- Blastobasis rebeli Karsholt & Sinev, 2004
- Auximobasis normalis Meyrick, 1918

== Oecophoridae ==
- Stathmopoda pedella (Linnaeus, 1761)

== Momphidae ==
- Batrachedra praeangusta (Haworth, 1828)
- Batrachedra pinicolella (Zeller, 1839)
- Mompha langiella (Hübner, 1796)
- Mompha terminella (Humphreys & Westwood, 1845)
- Mompha locupletella ([Denis & Schiffermüller], 1775)
- Mompha raschkiella (Zeller, 1839)
- Mompha miscella ([Denis & Schiffermüller], 1775)
- Mompha conturbatella (Hübner, 1819)
- Mompha ochraceella (Curtis, 1839)
- Mompha lacteella (Stephens, 1834)
- Mompha propinquella (Stainton, 1851)
- Mompha divisella Herrich-Schäffer, 1854
- Mompha bradleyi Riedl, 1965
- Mompha jurassicella (Frey,1881)
- Mompha sturnipennella (Treitschke, 1833)
- Mompha subbistrigella (Haworth, 1828)
- Mompha epilobiella ([Denis & Schiffermüller], 1775)

== Cosmopterigidae ==
- Cosmopterix zieglerella (Hübner, 1810)
- Cosmopterix schmidiella Frey, 1856
- Cosmopterix orichalcea Stainton, 1861
- Cosmopterix scribaiella Zeller, 1850
- Cosmopterix pulchrimella Chambers, 1875
- Cosmopterix lienigiella Lienig & Zeller, 1846
- Anatrachyntis badia (Hodges, 1962)
- Limnaecia phragmitella Stainton, 1851
- Pyroderces argyrogrammos (Zeller, 1847)
- Pancalia leuwenhoekella (Linnaeus, 1761)
- Pancalia schwarzella (Fabricius, 1798)
- Euclemensia woodiella (Curtis, 1830)
- Chrysoclista lathamella T. B. Fletcher, 1936
- Chrysoclista linneella (Clerck, 1759)
- Spuleria flavicaput (Haworth, 1828)
- Blastodacna hellerella (Duponchel, 1838)
- Blastodacna atra (Haworth, 1828) apple pith moth
- Dystebenna stephensi (Stainton, 1849)
- Sorhagenia rhamniella (Zeller, 1839)
- Sorhagenia lophyrella (Douglas, 1846)
- Sorhagenia janiszewskae Riedl, 1962

== Scythrididae ==
- Scythris grandipennis (Haworth, 1828)
- Scythris fuscoaenea (Haworth, 1828)
- Scythris fallacella (Schläger, 1847)
- Scythris crassiuscula (Herrich-Schäffer, 1855)
- Scythris picaepennis (Haworth, 1828)
- Scythris siccella (Zeller, 1839)
- Scythris empetrella Karsholt & Nielsen, 1976
- Scythris limbella (Fabricius, 1775)
- Scythris cicadella (Zeller, 1839)
- Scythris potentillella (Zeller, 1847)
- Scythris inspersella (Hübner, 1817)

== Tortricidae ==
- Phtheochroa inopiana (Haworth, 1811)
- Phtheochroa schreibersiana (Frölich, 1828)
- Phtheochroa sodaliana (Haworth, 1811)
- Hysterophora maculosana (Haworth, 1811)
- Phtheochroa rugosana (Hübner, 1799)
- Phalonidia manniana (Fischer von Röslerstamm, 1839)
- Gynnidomorpha minimana (Caradja, 1916)
- Gynnidomorpha permixtana ([Denis & Schiffermüller], 1775)
- Gynnidomorpha vectisana (Humphreys & Westwood, 1845)
- Gynnidomorpha alismana (Ragonot, 1883)
- Gynnidomorpha luridana (Gregson, 1870)
- Phalonidia affinitana (Douglas, 1846)
- Phalonidia gilvicomana (Zeller, 1847)
- Phalonidia curvistrigana (Stainton, 1859)
- Cochylimorpha alternana (Stephens, 1834)
- Cochylimorpha straminea (Haworth, 1811)
- Agapeta hamana (Linnaeus, 1758)
- Agapeta zoegana (Linnaeus, 1767)
- Aethes tesserana ([Denis & Schiffermüller], 1775)
- Aethes rutilana (Hübner, 1817)
- Aethes hartmanniana (Clerck, 1759)
- Aethes piercei Obraztsov, 1952
- Aethes margarotana (Duponchel, 1836)
- Aethes williana (Brahm, 1791)
- Aethes cnicana (Westwood, 1854)
- Aethes rubigana (Treitschke, 1830)
- Aethes smeathmanniana (Fabricius, 1781)
- Aethes margaritana (Haworth, 1811)
- Aethes dilucidana (Stephens, 1852)
- Aethes francillana (Fabricius, 1794)
- Aethes beatricella (Walsingham, 1898)
- Commophila aeneana (Hübner, 1800)
- Eugnosta lathoniana (Hübner, 1800)
- Eupoecilia angustana (Hübner, 1799)
- Eupoecilia ambiguella (Hübner, 1796) vine moth
- Cochylidia implicitana (Wocke, 1856)
- Cochylidia heydeniana (Herrich-Schäffer, 1851)
- Cochylidia subroseana (Haworth, 1811)
- Cochylidia rupicola (Curtis, 1834)
- Falseuncaria ruficiliana (Haworth, 1811)
- Falseuncaria degreyana (McLachlen, 1859)
- Cochylis roseana (Haworth, 1811)
- Cochylis flaviciliana (Westwood, 1854)
- Cochylis dubitana (Hübner, 1799)
- Cochylis molliculana Zeller, 1874
- Cochylis hybridella (Hübner, 1813)
- Cochylis atricapitana (Stephens, 1852)
- Cochylis pallidana Zeller, 1847
- Cochylis nana (Haworth, 1811)
- Pandemis corylana (Fabricius, 1794) chequered fruit-tree tortrix
- Pandemis cerasana (Hübner, 1786) barred fruit-tree tortrix
- Pandemis cinnamomeana (Treitschke, 1830)
- Pandemis heparana ([Denis & Schiffermüller], 1775) dark fruit-tree tortrix
- Pandemis dumetana (Treitschke, 1835)
- Argyrotaenia ljungiana (Thunberg, 1797)
- Homona menciana (Walker, 1863) camellia tortrix
- Archips oporana (Linnaeus, 1758)
- Archips podana (Scopoli, 1763) large fruit-tree tortrix
- Archips betulana (Hübner, 1787)
- Archips crataegana (Hübner, 1799) brown oak tortrix
- Archips xylosteana (Linnaeus, 1758) variegated golden tortrix
- Archips rosana (Linnaeus, 1758) rose tortrix
- Choristoneura diversana (Hübner, 1817)
- Choristoneura hebenstreitella (Müller, 1764)
- Choristoneura lafauryana (Ragonot, 1875)
- Cacoecimorpha pronubana (Hübner, 1799) carnation tortrix
- Syndemis musculana (Hübner, 1799)
- Ptycholomoides aeriferanus (Herrich-Schäffer, 1851)
- Aphelia viburnana ([Denis & Schiffermüller], 1775) bilberry tortrix
- Aphelia paleana (Hübner, 1793) timothy tortrix
- Aphelia unitana (Hübner, 1799)
- Clepsis senecionana (Hübner, 1819)
- Clepsis rurinana (Linnaeus, 1758)
- Clepsis spectrana (Treitschke, 1830) cyclamen tortrix
- Clepsis consimilana (Hübner, 1817)
- Clepsis trileucana (Doubleday, 1847)
- Clepsis melaleucanus (Walker, 1863)
- Epichoristodes acerbella (Walker, 1864) African carnation tortrix
- Epiphyas postvittana (Walker, 1863) light brown apple moth
- Adoxophyes orana (Fischer von Röslerstamm, 1834) summer fruit tortrix
- Adoxophyes privatana (Walker, 1863)
- Ptycholoma lecheana (Linnaeus, 1758)
- Lozotaeniodes formosanus (Geyer, 1830)
- Lozotaenia forsterana (Fabricius, 1781)
- Lozotaenia subocellana (Stephens, 1834)
- Paramesia gnomana (Clerck, 1759)
- Periclepsis cinctana ([Denis & Schiffermüller], 1775)
- Epagoge grotiana (Fabricius, 1781)
- Capua vulgana (Frölich, 1828)
- Philedone gerningana ([Denis & Schiffermüller], 1775)
- Philedonides lunana (Thunberg, 1784)
- Ditula angustiorana (Haworth, 1811) red-barred tortrix
- Pseudargyrotoza conwagana (Fabricius, 1775)
- Sparganothis pilleriana ([Denis & Schiffermüller], 1775)
- Olindia schumacherana (Fabricius, 1787)
- Isotrias rectifasciana (Haworth, 1811)
- Eulia ministrana (Linnaeus, 1758)
- Cnephasia longana (Haworth, 1811)
- Cnephasia gueneana (Duponchel, 1836)
- Cnephasia communana (Herrich-Schäffer, 1851)
- Cnephasia conspersana Douglas, 1846
- Cnephasia stephensiana (Doubleday, 1849) grey tortrix
- Cnephasia asseclana ([Denis & Schiffermüller], 1775) flax tortrix
- Cnephasia pasiuana (Hübner, 1799)
- Cnephasia genitalana Pierce & Metcalfe, 1915
- Cnephasia incertana (Treitschke, 1835) light grey tortrix
- Tortricodes alternella ([Denis & Schiffermüller], 1775)
- Exapate congelatella (Clerck, 1759)
- Neosphaleroptera nubilana (Hübner, 1799)
- Eana argentana (Clerck, 1759)
- Eana osseana (Scopoli, 1763)
- Eana incanana (Stephens, 1852)
- Eana penziana (Thunberg, 1791)
- Aleimma loeflingiana (Linnaeus, 1758)
- Tortrix viridana Linnaeus, 1758 green oak tortrix
- Spatalistis bifasciana (Hübner, 1787)
- Acleris bergmanniana (Linnaeus, 1758)
- Acleris forsskaleana (Linnaeus, 1758)
- Acleris holmiana (Linnaeus, 1758)
- Acleris laterana (Fabricius, 1794)
- Acleris comariana (Lienig & Zeller, 1846) strawberry tortrix
- Acleris caledoniana (Stephens, 1852)
- Acleris sparsana ([Denis & Schiffermüller], 1775)
- Acleris rhombana ([Denis & Schiffermüller], 1775) rhomboid tortrix
- Acleris aspersana (Hübner, 1817)
- Acleris ferrugana ([Denis & Schiffermüller], 1775)
- Acleris notana (Donovan, 1806)
- Acleris shepherdana (Stephens, 1852)
- Acleris schalleriana (Linnaeus, 1761)
- Acleris variegana ([Denis & Schiffermüller], 1775) garden rose tortrix
- Acleris permutana (Duponchel, 1836)
- Acleris kochiella (Goeze, 1783)
- Acleris logiana (Clerck, 1759)
- Acleris umbrana (Hübner, 1799)
- Acleris hastiana (Linnaeus, 1758)
- Acleris cristana ([Denis & Schiffermüller], 1775)
- Acleris hyemana (Haworth, 1811)
- Acleris lipsiana ([Denis & Schiffermüller], 1775)
- Acleris rufana ([Denis & Schiffermüller], 1775)
- Acleris lorquiniana (Duponchel, 1835)
- Acleris abietana (Hübner, 1822)
- Acleris maccana (Treitschke, 1835)
- Acleris literana (Linnaeus, 1758)
- Acleris emargana (Fabricius, 1775)
- Celypha striana ([Denis & Schiffermüller], 1775)
- Celypha rosaceana (Schläger, 1847)
- Celypha rufana (Scopoli, 1763)
- Celypha woodiana (Barrett, 1882)
- Celypha cespitana (Hübner, 1817)
- Celypha rivulana (Scopoli, 1763)
- Celypha aurofasciana (Haworth, 1811)
- Olethreutes mygindiana ([Denis & Schiffermüller], 1775)
- Olethreutes arbutella (Linnaeus, 1758)
- Olethreutes metallicana (Hübner, 1799)
- Olethreutes schulziana (Fabricius, 1777)
- Olethreutes palustrana (Lienig & Zeller, 1846)
- Phiaris micana ([Denis & Schiffermüller], 1775)
- Celypha lacunana ([Denis & Schiffermüller], 1775)
- Olethreutes obsoletana (Zetterstedt, 1840)
- Celypha doubledayana (Barrett, 1872)
- Piniphila bifasciana (Haworth, 1811)
- Olethreutes arcuella (Clerck, 1759)
- Pristerognatha penthinana (Guenée, 1845)
- Hedya pruniana (Hübner, 1799) plum tortrix
- Hedya nubiferana (Haworth, 1811) marbled orchard tortrix
- Hedya ochroleucana (Frölich, 1828)
- Metendothenia atropunctana (Zetterstedt, 1839)
- Hedya salicella (Linnaeus, 1758)
- Orthotaenia undulana ([Denis & Schiffermüller], 1775)
- Pseudosciaphila branderiana (Linnaeus, 1758)
- Apotomis semifasciana (Haworth, 1811)
- Apotomis infida (Heinrich, 1926)
- Apotomis lineana ([Denis & Schiffermüller], 1775)
- Apotomis turbidana (Hübner, 1825)
- Apotomis betuletana (Haworth, 1811)
- Apotomis capreana (Hübner, 1817)
- Apotomis sororculana (Zetterstedt, 1839)
- Apotomis sauciana (Frölich, 1828)
- Endothenia gentianaeana (Hübner, 1799)
- Endothenia oblongana (Haworth, 1811)
- Endothenia marginana (Haworth, 1811)
- Endothenia pullana (Haworth, 1811)
- Endothenia ustulana (Haworth, 1811)
- Endothenia nigricostana (Haworth, 1811)
- Endothenia ericetana (Humphreys & Westwood, 1845)
- Endothenia quadrimaculana (Haworth, 1811)
- Lobesia occidentis Falkovitsh, 1970
- Lobesia reliquana (Hübner, 1825)
- Lobesia botrana ([Denis & Schiffermüller], 1775) European vine moth
- Lobesia abscisana (Doubleday, 1849)
- Lobesia littoralis (Humphreys & Westwood, 1845)
- Bactra furfurana (Haworth, 1811)
- Bactra lancealana (Hübner, 1799)
- Bactra lacteana (Caradja, 1916)
- Bactra robustana (Christoph, 1872)
- Eudemis profundana ([Denis & Schiffermüller], 1775)
- Eudemis porphyrana (Hübner, 1799)
- Ancylis achatana ([Denis & Schiffermüller], 1775)
- Ancylis comptana (Frölich, 1828)
- Ancylis unguicella (Linnaeus, 1758)
- Ancylis uncella ([Denis & Schiffermüller], 1775)
- Ancylis geminana (Donovan, 1806)
- Ancylis diminutana (Haworth, 1811)
- Ancylis mitterbacheriana ([Denis & Schiffermüller], 1775)
- Ancylis upupana (Treitschke, 1835)
- Ancylis obtusana (Haworth, 1811)
- Ancylis laetana (Fabricius, 1775)
- Ancylis tineana (Hübner, 1799)
- Ancylis unculana (Haworth, 1811)
- Ancylis badiana ([Denis & Schiffermüller], 1775)
- Ancylis paludana (Barrett, 1871)
- Ancylis myrtillana (Treitschke, 1830)
- Ancylis apicella ([Denis & Schiffermüller], 1775)
- Epinotia pygmaeana (Hübner, 1799)
- Epinotia subsequana (Haworth, 1811)
- Epinotia subocellana (Donovan, 1806)
- Epinotia bilunana (Haworth, 1811)
- Epinotia ramella (Linnaeus, 1758)
- Epinotia demarniana (Fischer von Röslerstamm, 1840)
- Epinotia immundana (Fischer von Röslerstamm, 1839)
- Epinotia tetraquetrana (Haworth, 1811)
- Epinotia nisella (Clerck, 1759)
- Epinotia tenerana ([Denis & Schiffermüller], 1775) nut bud moth
- Epinotia nigricana (Herrich-Schäffer, 1851)
- Epinotia nemorivaga (Tengström, 1848)
- Epinotia tedella (Clerck, 1759)
- Epinotia fraternana (Haworth, 1811)
- Epinotia signatana (Douglas, 1845)
- Epinotia nanana (Treitschke, 1835)
- Epinotia rubiginosana (Herrich-Schäffer, 1851)
- Epinotia cruciana (Linnaeus, 1761) willow tortrix
- Epinotia mercuriana (Frölich, 1828)
- Epinotia crenana (Hübner, 1817)
- Epinotia abbreviana (Fabricius, 1794)
- Epinotia trigonella (Linnaeus, 1758)
- Epinotia maculana (Fabricius, 1775)
- Epinotia sordidana (Hübner, 1824)
- Epinotia caprana (Fabricius, 1798)
- Epinotia brunnichana (Linnaeus, 1767)
- Epinotia solandriana (Linnaeus, 1758)
- Crocidosema plebejana (Zeller, 1847)
- Rhopobota ustomaculana (Curtis, 1831)
- Rhopobota naevana (Hübner, 1817) holly tortrix
- Acroclita subsequana (Herrich-Schäffer, 1851)
- Rhopobota stagnana ([Denis & Schiffermüller], 1775)
- Rhopobota myrtillana (Humphreys & Westwood, 1845)
- Zeiraphera ratzeburgiana (Ratzeburgh, 1840)
- Zeiraphera rufimitrana (Herrich-Schäffer, 1851)
- Zeiraphera isertana (Fabricius, 1794)
- Zeiraphera griseana (Hübner, 1799) larch tortrix
- Gypsonoma aceriana (Duponchel, 1843)
- Gypsonoma sociana (Haworth, 1811)
- Gypsonoma dealbana (Frölich, 1828)
- Gypsonoma oppressana (Treitschke, 1835)
- Gypsonoma minutana (Hübner, 1799)
- Gypsonoma nitidulana (Lienig & Zeller, 1846)
- Gibberifera simplana (Fischer von Röslerstamm, 1836)
- Epiblema cynosbatella (Linnaeus, 1758)
- Epiblema uddmanniana (Linnaeus, 1758) bramble shoot moth
- Epiblema trimaculana (Haworth, 1811)
- Epiblema rosaecolana (Doubleday, 1850)
- Epiblema roborana ([Denis & Schiffermüller], 1775)
- Epiblema incarnatana (Hübner, 1800)
- Epiblema tetragonana (Stephens, 1834)
- Epiblema grandaevana (Lienig & Zeller, 1846)
- Epiblema turbidana (Treitschke, 1835)
- Epiblema foenella (Linnaeus, 1758)
- Epiblema scutulana ([Denis & Schiffermüller], 1775)
- Epiblema cirsiana (Zeller, 1843)
- Epiblema cnicicolana (Zeller, 1847)
- Epiblema sticticana (Fabricius, 1794)
- Epiblema costipunctana (Haworth, 1811)
- Pelochrista caecimaculana (Hübner, 1799)
- Eriopsela quadrana (Hübner, 1813)
- Eucosma aspidiscana (Hübner, 1817)
- Eucosma rubescana (Constant, 1895)
- Eucosma conterminana (Guenée, 1845)
- Eucosma tripoliana (Barrett, 1880)
- Eucosma aemulana (Schläger, 1849)
- Eucosma lacteana (Treitschke, 1835)
- Eucosma metzneriana (Treitschke, 1830)
- Eucosma campoliliana ([Denis & Schiffermüller], 1775)
- Eucosma pauperana (Duponchel, 1843)
- Eucosma pupillana (Clerck, 1759)
- Eucosma hohenwartiana ([Denis & Schiffermüller], 1775)
- Eucosma cana (Haworth, 1811)
- Eucosma obumbratana (Lienig & Zeller, 1846)
- Thiodia torridana Lederer, 1859
- Thiodia citrana (Hübner, 1799)
- Spilonota ocellana ([Denis & Schiffermüller], 1775) bud moth
- Spilonota laricana (Heinemann, 1863)
- Clavigesta sylvestrana (Curtis, 1850)
- Clavigesta purdeyi (Durrant, 1911) pine leaf-mining moth
- Pseudococcyx posticana (Zetterstedt, 1839)
- Pseudococcyx turionella (Linnaeus, 1758) pine bud moth
- Rhyacionia buoliana ([Denis & Schiffermüller], 1775) pine shoot moth
- Rhyacionia pinicolana (Doubleday, 1849)
- Rhyacionia pinivorana (Lienig & Zeller, 1846) spotted shoot moth
- Rhyacionia logaea Durrant, 1911 Elgin shoot moth
- Retinia resinella (Linnaeus, 1758) pine resin-gall moth
- Thaumatotibia leucotreta (Meyrick, 1913) false codling moth
- Enarmonia formosana (Scopoli, 1763) cherry-bark moth
- Eucosmomorpha albersana (Hübner, 1813)
- Selania leplastriana (Curtis, 1831)
- Lathronympha strigana (Fabricius, 1775)
- Cydia microgrammana (Guenée, 1845)
- Strophedra weirana (Douglas, 1850)
- Strophedra nitidana (Fabricius, 1794)
- Pammene splendidulana (Guenée, 1845)
- Pammene luedersiana (Sorhagen, 1885)
- Pammene obscurana (Stephens, 1834)
- Pammene agnotana Rebel, 1914
- Pammene giganteana (Peyerimhoff, 1863)
- Pammene argyrana (Hübner, 1799)
- Pammene ignorata Kuznetsov, 1968
- Pammene albuginana (Guenée, 1845)
- Pammene suspectana (Lienig & Zeller, 1846)
- Pammene spiniana (Duponchel, 1843)
- Pammene populana (Fabricius, 1787)
- Pammene aurita Razowski, 1991
- Pammene regiana (Zeller, 1849)
- Pammene trauniana ([Denis & Schiffermüller], 1775)
- Pammene fasciana (Linnaeus, 1761)
- Pammene germmana (Hübner, 1799)
- Pammene ochsenheimeriana (Lienig & Zeller, 1846)
- Pammene rhediella (Clerck, 1759) fruitlet mining tortrix
- Grapholita caecana (Schläger, 1847)
- Grapholita compositella (Fabricius, 1775)
- Grapholita delineana (Walker, 1863) hemp moth
- Grapholita internana (Guenée, 1845)
- Grapholita pallifrontana (Lienig & Zeller, 1846)
- Grapholita gemmiferana (Treitschke, 1835)
- Grapholita janthinana (Duponchel, 1835)
- Grapholita tenebrosana (Duponchel, 1843)
- Grapholita funebrana (Treitschke, 1835) plum fruit moth
- Grapholita molesta (Busck, 1916) Oriental fruit moth
- Grapholita lobarzewskii (Nowicki, 1860)
- Grapholita lathyrana (Hübner, 1813)
- Grapholita jungiella (Clerck, 1759)
- Grapholita lunulana ([Denis & Schiffermüller], 1775)
- Grapholita orobana (Treitschke, 1830)
- Cydia strobilella (Linnaeus, 1758)
- Cydia ulicetana (Haworth, 1811)
- Cydia servillana (Duponchel, 1836)
- Cydia nigricana (Fabricius, 1794) pea moth
- Cydia millenniana (Adamczewski, 1967)
- Cydia fagiglandana (Zeller, 1841)
- Cydia splendana (Hübner, 1799)
- Cydia pomonella (Linnaeus, 1758) codling moth
- Cydia amplana (Hübner, 1799)
- Cydia inquinatana (Hübner, 1799)
- Cydia leguminana (Lienig & Zeller, 1846)
- Cydia cognatana (Barrett, 1874)
- Cydia pactolana (Zeller, 1840)
- Cydia cosmophorana (Treitschke, 1835)
- Cydia coniferana (Ratzeburgh, 1840)
- Cydia conicolana (Heylaerts, 1874)
- Cydia corollana (Hübner, 1823)
- Pammene gallicana (Guenée, 1845)
- Pammene aurana (Fabricius, 1775)
- Dichrorampha petiverella (Linnaeus, 1758)
- Dichrorampha alpinana (Treitschke, 1830)
- Dichrorampha flavidorsana Knaggs, 1867
- Dichrorampha plumbagana (Treitschke, 1830)
- Dichrorampha senectana Guenée, 1845
- Dichrorampha sequana (Hübner, 1799)
- Dichrorampha acuminatana (Lienig & Zeller, 1846)
- Dichrorampha consortana Stephens, 1852
- Dichrorampha simpliciana (Haworth, 1811)
- Dichrorampha sylvicolana Heinemann, 1863
- Dichrorampha montanana (Duponchel, 1843)
- Dichrorampha vancouverana McDunnough, 1935
- Dichrorampha plumbana (Scopoli, 1763)
- Dichrorampha sedatana Busck, 1906
- Dichrorampha aeratana (Pierce & Metcalfe, 1915)

== Alucitidae ==
- Alucita hexadactyla Linnaeus, 1758 twenty-plume moth

== Crambidae ==
- Ecpyrrhorrhoe diffusalis (Guenée, 1854) horehound pearl
- Euchromius cambridgei Zeller, 1867
- Euchromius ocellea (Haworth, 1811)
- Chilo phragmitella (Hübner, 1805)
- Haimbachia cicatricella (Hübner, 1824)
- Calamotropha paludella (Hübner, 1824)
- Chrysoteuchia culmella (Linnaeus, 1758)
- Crambus pascuella (Linnaeus, 1758)
- Crambus leucoschalis Hampson, 1898
- Crambus silvella (Hübner, 1813)
- Crambus uliginosellus Zeller, 1850
- Crambus ericella (Hübner, 1813)
- Crambus hamella (Thunberg, 1788)
- Crambus pratella (Linnaeus, 1758)
- Crambus lathoniellus (Zincken, 1817)
- Crambus perlella (Scopoli, 1763)
- Agriphila selasella (Hübner, 1813)
- Agriphila straminella ([Denis & Schiffermüller], 1775)
- Agriphila tristella ([Denis & Schiffermüller], 1775)
- Agriphila inquinatella ([Denis & Schiffermüller], 1775)
- Agriphila latistria (Haworth, 1811)
- Agriphila geniculea (Haworth, 1811)
- Catoptria permutatella (Herrich-Schäffer, 1848)
- Catoptria osthelderi (de Lattin, 1950)
- Catoptria speculalis Hübner, 1825
- Catoptria pinella (Linnaeus, 1758)
- Catoptria margaritella ([Denis & Schiffermüller], 1775)
- Catoptria furcatellus (Zetterstedt, 1840)
- Catoptria falsella ([Denis & Schiffermüller], 1775)
- Catoptria verellus (Zincken, 1817)
- Catoptria lythargyrella (Hübner, 1796)
- Chrysocrambus linetella (Fabricius, 1781)
- Chrysocrambus craterella (Scopoli, 1763)
- Thisanotia chrysonuchella (Scopoli, 1763)
- Pediasia fascelinella (Hübner, 1813)
- Pediasia contaminella (Hübner, 1796)
- Pediasia aridella (Thunberg, 1788)
- Platytes alpinella (Hübner, 1813)
- Platytes cerussella ([Denis & Schiffermüller], 1775)
- Ancylolomia tentaculella (Hübner, 1796)
- Schoenobius gigantella ([Denis & Schiffermüller], 1775)
- Donacaula forficella (Thunberg, 1794)
- Donacaula mucronellus ([Denis & Schiffermüller], 1775)
- Acentria ephemerella ([Denis & Schiffermüller], 1775) water veneer
- Scoparia subfusca Haworth, 1811
- Scoparia pyralella ([Denis & Schiffermüller], 1775)
- Scoparia ambigualis (Treitschke, 1829)
- Scoparia basistrigalis Knaggs, 1866
- Scoparia ancipitella (La Harpe, 1855)
- Eudonia pallida (Curtis, 1827)
- Eudonia alpina (Curtis, 1850)
- Dipleurina lacustrata (Panzer, 1804)
- Eudonia murana (Curtis, 1827)
- Eudonia truncicolella (Stainton, 1849)
- Eudonia lineola (Curtis, 1827)
- Eudonia angustea (Curtis, 1827)
- Eudonia delunella (Stainton, 1849)
- Eudonia mercurella (Linnaeus, 1758)
- Elophila nymphaeata (Linnaeus, 1758) brown china-mark
- Elophila difflualis (Snellen, 1880)
- Elophila melagynalis Aggasiz, 1978
- Parapoynx stratiotata (Linnaeus, 1758) ringed china-mark
- Parapoynx obscuralis (Grote, 1881)
- Nymphula stagnata (Donovan, 1806) beautiful china-mark
- Parapoynx diminutalis (Snellen, 1880)
- Agassiziella angulipennis (Hampson, 1891)
- Oligostigma bilinealis Snellen, 1876
- Cataclysta lemnata (Linnaeus, 1758) small china-mark
- Synclita obliteralis Walker, 1859
- Evergestis forficalis (Linnaeus, 1758) garden pebble
- Evergestis limbata (Linnaeus, 1767)
- Evergestis extimalis (Scopoli, 1763)
- Evergestis pallidata (Hufnagel, 1767)
- Cynaeda dentalis ([Denis & Schiffermüller], 1775)
- Metaxmeste phrygialis (Hübner, 1796)
- Hellula undalis (Fabricius, 1781) Old World webworm
- Pyrausta aurata (Scopoli, 1763)
- Pyrausta purpuralis (Linnaeus, 1758)
- Pyrausta ostrinalis (Hübner, 1796)
- Pyrausta sanguinalis (Linnaeus, 1767)
- Pyrausta despicata (Scopoli, 1763)
- Pyrausta nigrata (Scopoli, 1763)
- Pyrausta cingulata (Linnaeus, 1758)
- Loxostege sticticalis (Linnaeus, 1761)
- Uresiphita gilvata (Fabricius, 1794)
- Sitochroa palealis ([Denis & Schiffermüller], 1775)
- Sitochroa verticalis (Linnaeus, 1758)
- Paracorsia repandalis ([Denis & Schiffermüller], 1775)
- Paratalanta pandalis (Hübner, 1825) bordered pearl
- Paratalanta hyalinalis (Hübner, 1796)
- Sclerocona acutellus (Eversmann, 1842)
- Ostrinia nubilalis (Hübner, 1796) European corn-borer
- Eurrhypara hortulata (Linnaeus, 1758) small magpie
- Perinephela lancealis (Denis & Schiffermüller, 1775)
- Phlyctaenia coronata (Hufnagel, 1767)
- Algedonia terrealis (Treitschke, 1829)
- Phlyctaenia perlucidalis (Hübner, 1809)
- Anania funebris (Ström, 1768)
- Anania verbascalis ([Denis & Schiffermüller], 1775)
- Psammotis pulveralis (Hübner, 1796)
- Phlyctaenia stachydalis (Germar, 1822)
- Ebulea crocealis (Hübner, 1796)
- Opsibotys fuscalis ([Denis & Schiffermüller], 1775)
- Nascia cilialis (Hübner, 1796)
- Udea lutealis (Hübner, 1809)
- Udea fulvalis (Hübner, 1809)
- Udea prunalis ([Denis & Schiffermüller], 1775)
- Udea decrepitalis (Herrich-Schäffer, 1848)
- Udea olivalis ([Denis & Schiffermüller], 1775)
- Udea uliginosalis (Stephens, 1829)
- Udea alpinalis ([Denis & Schiffermüller], 1775)
- Udea ferrugalis (Hübner, 1796) rusty dot pearl
- Mecyna flavalis Caradja, 1916
- Mecyna asinalis (Hübner, 1819)
- Diplopseustis perieresalis (Walker, 1859)
- Nomophila noctuella ([Denis & Schiffermüller], 1775) rush veneer
- Dolicharthria punctalis ([Denis & Schiffermüller], 1775)
- Antigastra catalaunalis (Duponchel, 1833)
- Maruca vitrata (Fabricius, 1787) mung moth
- Diasemia reticularis (Linnaeus, 1761)
- Diasemiopsis ramburialis (Duponchel, 1834)
- Duponchelia fovealis Zeller, 1847
- Hymenia recurvalis (Fabricius, 1775)
- Pleuroptya ruralis (Scopoli, 1763) mother of pearl
- Herpetogramma centrostrigalis (Stephens, 1834)
- Herpetogramma aegrotalis (Zeller, 1852)
- Herpetogramma licarsisalis (Walker, 1859) grass webworm
- Palpita vitrealis (Rossi, 1794)
- Hodebertia testalis (Fabricius, 1794)
- Diaphania indica (Saunders, 1851) melonworm
- Diaphania perspectalis (Walker, 1859)
- Agrotera nemoralis (Scopoli, 1763)
- Conogethes punctiferalis (Guenée, 1854)
- Leucinodes vagans Tutt, 1890
- Sceliodes laisalis (Walker, 1859)

== Pyralidae ==
- Hypsopygia costalis (Fabricius, 1775) gold triangle
- Synaphe punctalis (Fabricius, 1775)
- Orthopygia glaucinalis (Linnaeus, 1758)
- Pyralis lienigialis (Zeller, 1843)
- Pyralis farinalis (Linnaeus, 1758) meal moth
- Pyralis manihotalis Guenée, 1854
- Pyralis pictalis (Curtis, 1834) painted meal moth
- Aglossa caprealis (Hübner, 1809) small tabby
- Aglossa pinguinalis (Linnaeus, 1758) large tabby
- Aglossa dimidiata (Haworth, 1809) tea tabby
- Aglossa ocellalis Lederer, 1863
- Endotricha flammealis ([Denis & Schiffermüller], 1775)
- Galleria mellonella (Linnaeus, 1758) wax moth
- Achroia grisella (Fabricius, 1794) lesser wax moth
- Corcyra cephalonica (Stainton, 1866) rice moth
- Aphomia sociella (Linnaeus, 1758) bee moth
- Melissoblaptes zelleri (de Joannis, 1932)
- Lamoria anella (Denis & Schiffermüller, 1775)
- Paralipsa gularis (Zeller, 1877) stored nut moth
- Arenipses sabella (Hampson, 1901)
- Anerastia lotella (Hübner, 1913)
- Cryptoblabes bistriga (Haworth, 1811)
- Cryptoblabes gnidiella (Millière, 1867)
- Conobathra tumidana ([Denis & Schiffermüller], 1775)
- Conobathra repandana (Fabricius, 1798)
- Acrobasis consociella (Hübner, 1813)
- Trachycera suavella (Zincken, 1818)
- Trachycera advenella (Zincken, 1818)
- Trachycera marmorea (Haworth, 1811)
- Oncocera semirubella (Scopoli, 1763)
- Pempelia palumbella ([Denis & Schiffermüller], 1775)
- Pempelia genistella (Duponchel, 1836)
- Pempelia obductella (Zeller, 1839)
- Pempelia formosa (Haworth, 1811)
- Salebriopsis albicilla (Herrich-Schäffer, 1849)
- Sciota hostilis (Stephens, 1834)
- Sciota adelphella (Fischer von Röslerstamm, 1836)
- Selagia argyrella ([Denis & Schiffermüller], 1775)
- Elegia fallax (Staudinger, 1881)
- Elegia similella (Zincken, 1818)
- Ortholepis betulae (Goeze, 1778)
- Pyla fusca (Haworth, 1811)
- Etiella zinckenella (Treitschke, 1832)
- Phycita roborella ([Denis & Schiffermüller], 1775)
- Pima boisduvaliella (Guenée, 1845)
- Dioryctria abietella ([Denis & Schiffermüller], 1775)
- Dioryctria schuetzeella Fuchs, 1899
- Dioryctria sylvestrella (Ratzeburg, 1840)
- Dioryctria simplicella Heinemann, 1863
- Epischnia bankesiella Richardson, 1888
- Hypochalcia ahenella ([Denis & Schiffermüller], 1775)
- Myelois circumvoluta (Fourceroy, 1785) thistle ermine
- Eurhodope cirrigerella (Zincken, 1818)
- Apomyelois ceratoniae (Zeller, 1839) locust bean moth
- Assara terebrella (Zincken, 1818)
- Pempeliella dilutella ([Denis & Schiffermüller], 1775)
- Pempeliella ornatella ([Denis & Schiffermüller], 1775)
- Gymnancyla canella ([Denis & Schiffermüller], 1775)
- Zophodia grossulariella (Hübner, 1809)
- Nephopterix angustella (Hübner, 1796)
- Mussidia nigrivenella Ragonot, 1888
- Ancylosis cinnamomella (Duponchel, 1836)
- Ancylosis oblitella (Zeller, 1848)
- Nyctegretis lineana (Scopoli, 1786)
- Euzophera cinerosella (Zeller, 1839)
- Euzophera pinguis (Haworth, 1811)
- Euzophera osseatella (Treitschke, 1832)
- Euzophera bigella (Zeller, 1848)
- Ephestia elutella (Hübner, 1796) cacao moth
- Ephestia parasitella Staudinger, 1881
- Ephestia kuehniella Zeller, 1879 Mediterranean flour moth
- Ephestia cautella (Walker, 1863) dried currant moth
- Ephestia figulilella (Gregson, 1871) raisin moth
- Ephestia calidella (Guenée, 1845) dried fruit moth
- Vitula edmandsii (Packard, 1864)
- Vitula biviella (Zeller, 1848)
- Plodia interpunctella (Hübner, 1813) Indian meal moth
- Homoeosoma nebulella ([Denis & Schiffermüller], 1775)
- Homoeosoma sinuella (Fabricius, 1794)
- Homoeosoma nimbella (Duponchel, 1836)
- Phycitodes binaevella (Hübner, 1813)
- Phycitodes saxicola (Vaughan, 1870)
- Phycitodes maritima (Tengström, 1848)
- Apomyelois bistriatella (Ragonot, 1887)

== Pterophoridae ==
- Agdistis meridionalis (Zeller, 1847)
- Agdistis bennetii (Curtis, 1833)
- Agdistis tamaricis (Zeller, 1847) tamarisk plume
- Oxyptilus pilosellae (Zeller, 1841)
- Oxyptilus parvidactylus (Haworth, 1811)
- Oxyptilus distans (Zeller, 1847)
- Oxyptilus laetus (Zeller, 1847)
- Buckleria paludum (Zeller, 1839)
- Capperia britanniodactyla (Gregson, 1869)
- Marasmarcha lunaedactyla (Haworth, 1811)
- Cnaemidophorus rhododactyla ([Denis & Schiffermüller], 1775)
- Amblyptilia acanthadactyla (Hübner, 1813)
- Amblyptilia punctidactyla (Haworth, 1811)
- Platyptilia tesseradactyla (Linnaeus, 1761)
- Platyptilia calodactyla ([Denis & Schiffermüller], 1775)
- Platyptilia gonodactyla ([Denis & Schiffermüller], 1775)
- Platyptilia isodactylus (Zeller, 1852)
- Platyptilia ochrodactyla ([Denis & Schiffermüller], 1775)
- Platyptilia pallidactyla (Haworth, 1811)
- Stenoptilia pneumonanthes (Büttner, 1880)
- Stenoptilia millieridactyla (Bruand, 1859)
- Stenoptilia zophodactylus (Duponchel, 1840)
- Stenoptilia bipunctidactyla (Scopoli, 1763)
- Stenoptilia islandicus (Staudinger, 1857)
- Stenoptilia aridus (Zeller, 1847)
- Stenoptilia annadactyla Sutter, 1988
- Stenoptilia pterodactyla (Linnaeus, 1761)
- Merrifieldia leucodactyla (Denis & Schiffermüller, 1775)
- Merrifieldia tridactyla (Linnaeus, 1758)
- Merrifieldia baliodactylus (Zeller, 1841)
- Pterophorus pentadactyla (Linnaeus, 1758) white plume moth
- Pterophorus galactodactyla ([Denis & Schiffermüller], 1775)
- Pterophorus spilodactylus (Curtis, 1827)
- Pselnophorus heterodactyla (Müller, 1764)
- Adaina microdactyla (Hübner, 1813)
- Ovendenia lienigianus (Zeller, 1852)
- Euleioptilus carphodactyla (Hübner, 1813)
- Hellinsia osteodactylus (Zeller, 1841)
- Hellinsia chrysocomae (Ragonot, 1875)
- Euleioptilus tephradactyla (Hübner, 1813)
- Oidaematophorus lithodactyla (Treitschke, 1833)
- Emmelina monodactyla (Linnaeus, 1758)
- Emmelina argoteles (Meyrick, 1922)

== See also ==
- List of moths of Great Britain (overview)
  - Family lists: Hepialidae, Cossidae, Zygaenidae, Limacodidae, Sesiidae, Lasiocampidae, Saturniidae, Endromidae, Drepanidae, Thyatiridae, Geometridae, Sphingidae, Notodontidae, Thaumetopoeidae, Lymantriidae, Arctiidae, Ctenuchidae, Nolidae, Noctuidae and Micromoths
