= Coleophora vibicigerella =

Scientific classification
- Kingdom: Animalia
- Phylum: Arthropoda
- Class: Insecta
- Order: Lepidoptera
- Family: Coleophoridae
- Genus: Coleophora
- Species: C. vibicigerella

Binomial name
- Coleophora vibicigerella Zeller, 1839

Synonyms
- Coleophora didyma Toll, 1957; Coleophora mandschuriae Toll, 1942

Species of moth

Coleophora vibicigerella is a moth of the family Coleophoridae found in Asia, Europe and north Africa. It was first described by Philipp Christoph Zeller in 1839.

== Description ==
The wingspan is 10.5–14 mm. Adults are on wing in late May and June.

The larvae feed on yarrow (Achillea millefolium) and field wormwood (Artemisia campestris). Larvae can be found from September to May.

== Distribution ==
It is found from Sweden and Finland to the Iberian Peninsula, Italy and Bulgaria and from Great Britain to the Baltic states. It is also found in North Africa, China and Korea.
