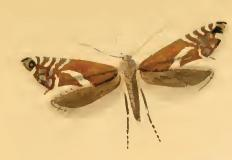

Scientific classification
- Kingdom: Animalia
- Phylum: Arthropoda
- Clade: Pancrustacea
- Class: Insecta
- Order: Lepidoptera
- Family: Glyphipterigidae
- Genus: Glyphipterix
- Species: G. haworthana

Binomial name
- Glyphipterix haworthana (Stephens, 1834)

Synonyms
- Heribeia haworthana Stephens, 1834; Aechmia haworthana; Aechmia haworthella; Heribeia haworthana Stephens, 1834; Oecophora zonella Zetterstedt, [1839]; Glyphipteryx schultzella Amsel, 1949

= Glyphipterix haworthana =

Haworth's glyphipterid moth

Species of moth

Glyphipterix haworthana, Haworth's glyphipterid moth, is a moth of the family Glyphipterigidae. It is found in most of Europe, as well as North America.

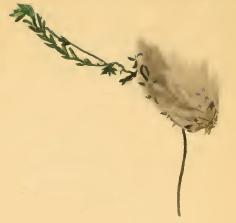
A head of Eriophorum vaginatum tenanted by the larva and attached to a stem of Erica

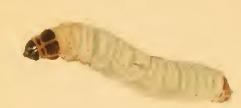
Larva

The wingspan is 11–15 mm. The forewings are rather broad, dark golden-bronzy; five shining white strigulae on posterior half of costa, three anterior terminating in leaden metallic marks; a thick oblique curved pointed white streak from middle of dorsum, reaching more than half across wing;a leaden-metallic tornal mark, white on margin; three leaden metallic dots on termen; an undefined dark apical spot; dark line of cilia indented below apex; a dark hook above apex. Hindwings are suboblong, grey; cilia in male whitish.The larva is pale ochreous; head dark brown : plate of 2 brownish-ochreous.

Adults are on wing in May. It is a day-flying species.

The larvae feed on Eriophorum species. They feed on the seeds of their host plant, spinning the cotton heads together or to nearby vegetation.

The name honours Adrian Hardy Haworth.
