= Coleophora tricolor =

Scientific classification
- Kingdom: Animalia
- Phylum: Arthropoda
- Class: Insecta
- Order: Lepidoptera
- Family: Coleophoridae
- Genus: Coleophora
- Species: C. tricolor

Binomial name
- Coleophora tricolor Walsingham, 1899.

Species of moth

The basil-thyme case-bearer moth (Coleophora tricolor) is a moth of the family Coleophoridae found in Europe. It was first described by the 6th Baron Walsingham in 1899.

== Description ==
The wingspan is 14–18 mm.

The larvae feed on grasses (Poaceae species), including Bromopsis erecta, cock's-foot (Dactylis glomerata), Yorkshire fog (Holcus lanatus), crested hair-grass (Koeleria macrantha), timothy (Phleum bertolonii) and common meadow-grass (Poa pratensis). Larvae can be found from September to June or July.

== Distribution ==
It is found in Great Britain, southern France and Greece.
