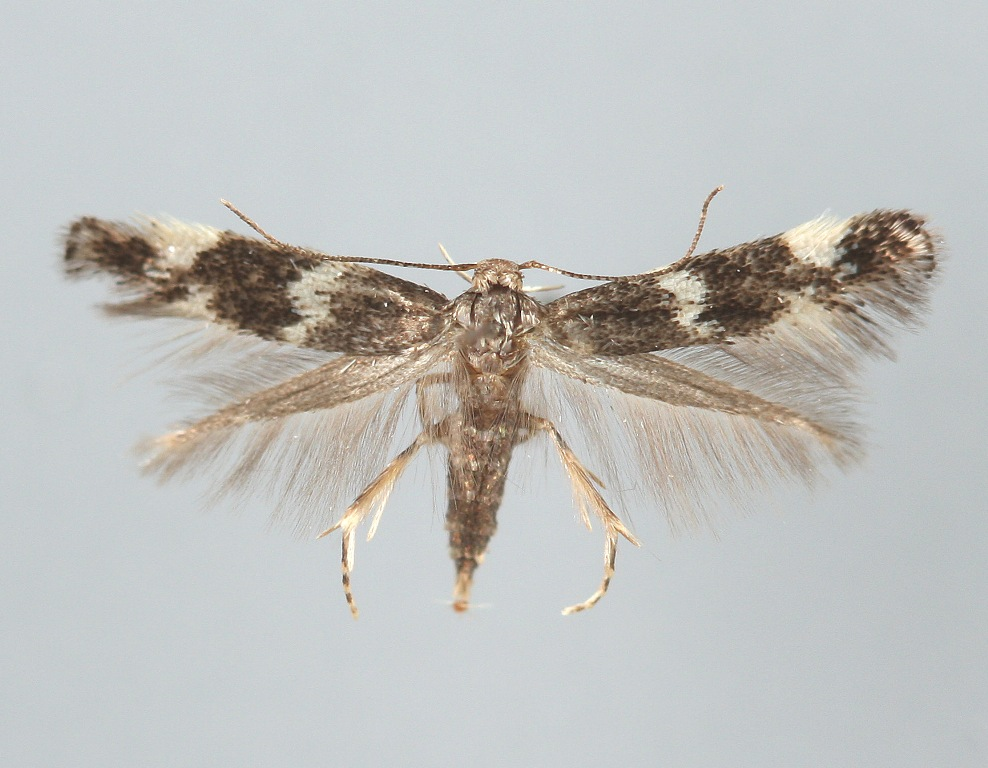

Scientific classification
- Kingdom: Animalia
- Phylum: Arthropoda
- Class: Insecta
- Order: Lepidoptera
- Family: Elachistidae
- Genus: Elachista
- Species: E. pomerana

Binomial name
- Elachista pomerana Frey, 1870

= Elachista pomerana =

Species of moth

Elachista pomerana is a moth of the family Elachistidae found in Europe.

== Description ==
The wingspan is 8–10 millimetres (0.31–0.39 in).

The larvae feed on common wild oat (Avena fatua), wood small-reed (Calamagrostis epigejos), floating sweet-grass (Glyceria fluitans), reed canary grass (Phalaris arundinacea) and common meadow-grass (Poa pratensis). The pupation takes place outside of the mine.

== Distribution ==
It is found from Fennoscandia to the Alps and from Great Britain to Romania.
