= Hellinsia chrysocomae =

Scientific classification
- Domain: Eukaryota
- Kingdom: Animalia
- Phylum: Arthropoda
- Class: Insecta
- Order: Lepidoptera
- Family: Pterophoridae
- Genus: Hellinsia
- Species: H. chrysocomae

Binomial name
- Hellinsia chrysocomae (Ragonot, 1875)

Synonyms
- Leioptilus chrysocomae Ragonot, 1875; Oidaematophorus bowesi Whalley, 1960; Leioptilus gozmanyi Bigot, 1969

Species of plume moth

Hellinsia chrysocomae, also known as the scarce goldenrod plume moth, is a moth of the family Pterophoridae, found in Great Britain, France, Germany, Switzerland and southern Russia.

The wingspan is about 18 millimetres (0.71 in).

The larvae feed on the flowers and seeds of ragwort (Jacobaea vulgaris), goldilocks aster (Aster linosyris) and European goldenrod (Solidago virgaurea).
