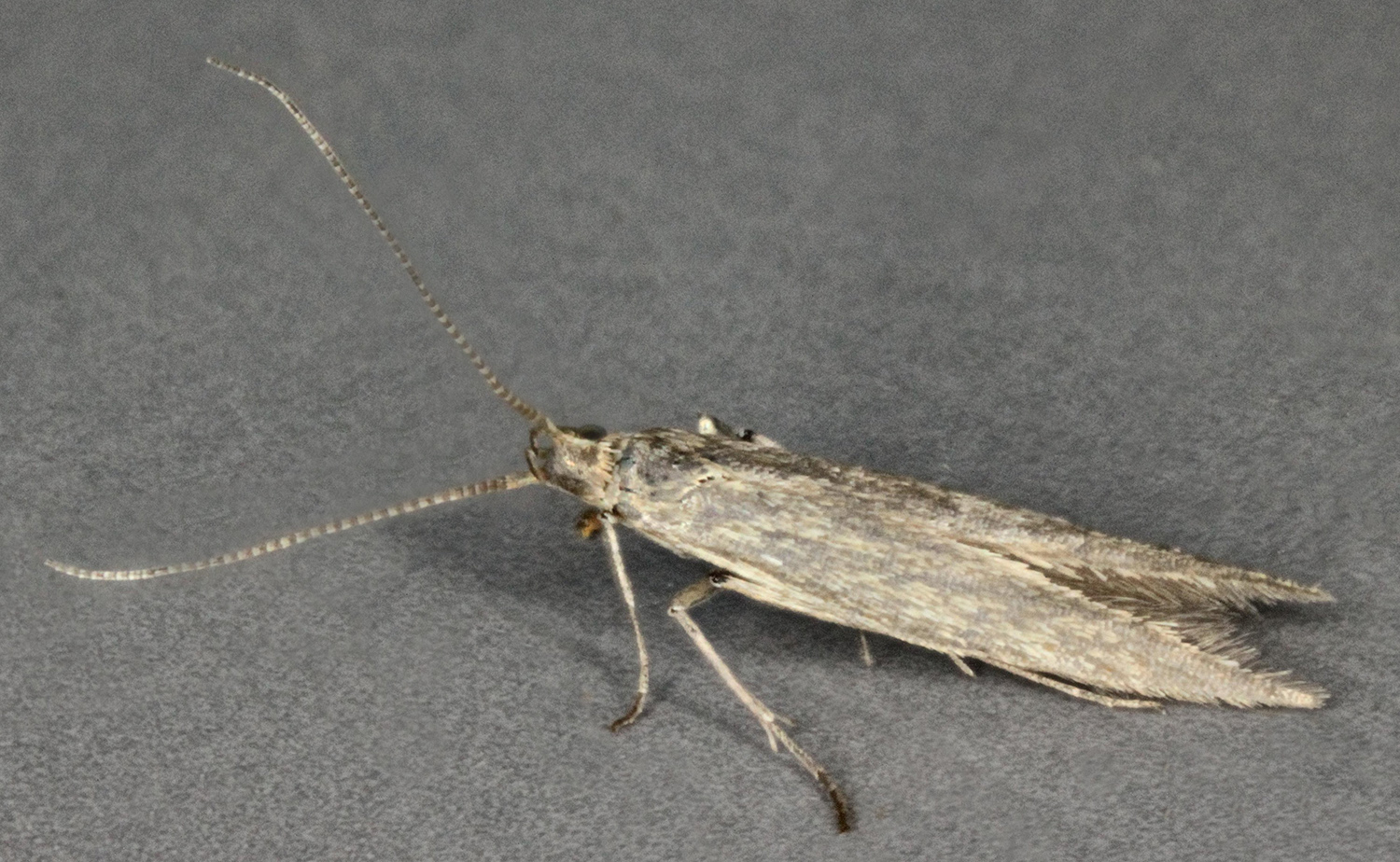

Scientific classification
- Kingdom: Animalia
- Phylum: Arthropoda
- Class: Insecta
- Order: Lepidoptera
- Family: Coleophoridae
- Genus: Coleophora
- Species: C. atriplicis

Binomial name
- Coleophora atriplicis Meyrick, 1928

Synonyms
- Coleophora cervinella McDunnough, 1946

= Coleophora atriplicis =

Species of moth

Coleophora atriplicis is a moth of the family Coleophoridae found in Europe and North America.

== Description ==
The wingspan is 12–14 mm. It is very similar to other Coleophora and impossible to identify without dissection and microscopic examination of the genitalia. Adults are on wing from July to August in western Europe.

The larvae feed on grass-leaved orache (Atriplex littoralis), sea purslane (Halimione portulacoides), glasswort (Salicornia species) and sea-blite (Suaeda species). Full-grown larvae can be found in October.

== Distribution ==
Coleophora atriplicis is found from Fennoscandia and northern Russia to France, Poland and Romania and from Ireland to Ukraine. It is also found in North America, with records from Alberta, British Columbia, Nova Scotia and Washington state.
