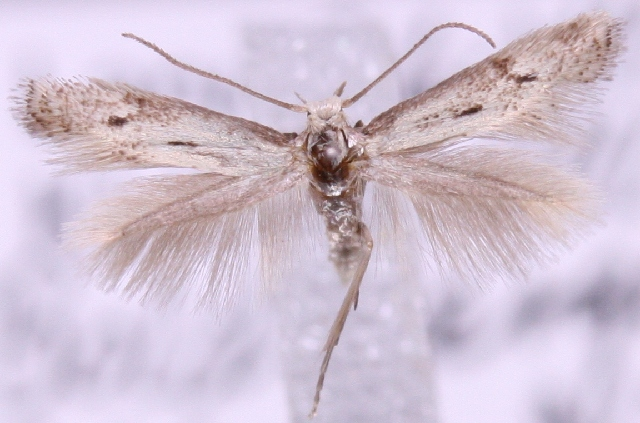

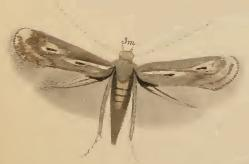

Scientific classification
- Kingdom: Animalia
- Phylum: Arthropoda
- Class: Insecta
- Order: Lepidoptera
- Family: Elachistidae
- Genus: Elachista
- Species: E. biatomella

Binomial name
- Elachista biatomella (Stainton, 1848)

Synonyms
- List: Biselachista biatomella Traugott-Olsen & Nielsen, 1977; Cosmiotes biatomella Clemens, 1860; Aphelosetia biatomella Stainton, 1848

= Elachista biatomella =

Species of moth

Elachista biatomella is a moth of the family Elachistidae found in Europe.

== Description ==
The wingspan is 7–9 millimetres (0.28–0.35 in). The head is pale grey, face whitish. Forewings are ochreous - whitish, irrorated with grey; plical and second discal stigmata elongate, black, plical preceded and followed by whitish marks; in darker specimens an oblique triangular white spot is visible on costa at 2/3, in paler specimens it is obsolete. Hindwings are grey. The larva is yellowish; head brown; 2 with two pale brown spots.

Adults are on wing from May to September in two generations per year.

== Distribution ==
It is found from Sweden to the Iberian Peninsula, Sardinia and Italy, and from Great Britain and Ireland to Ukraine.
