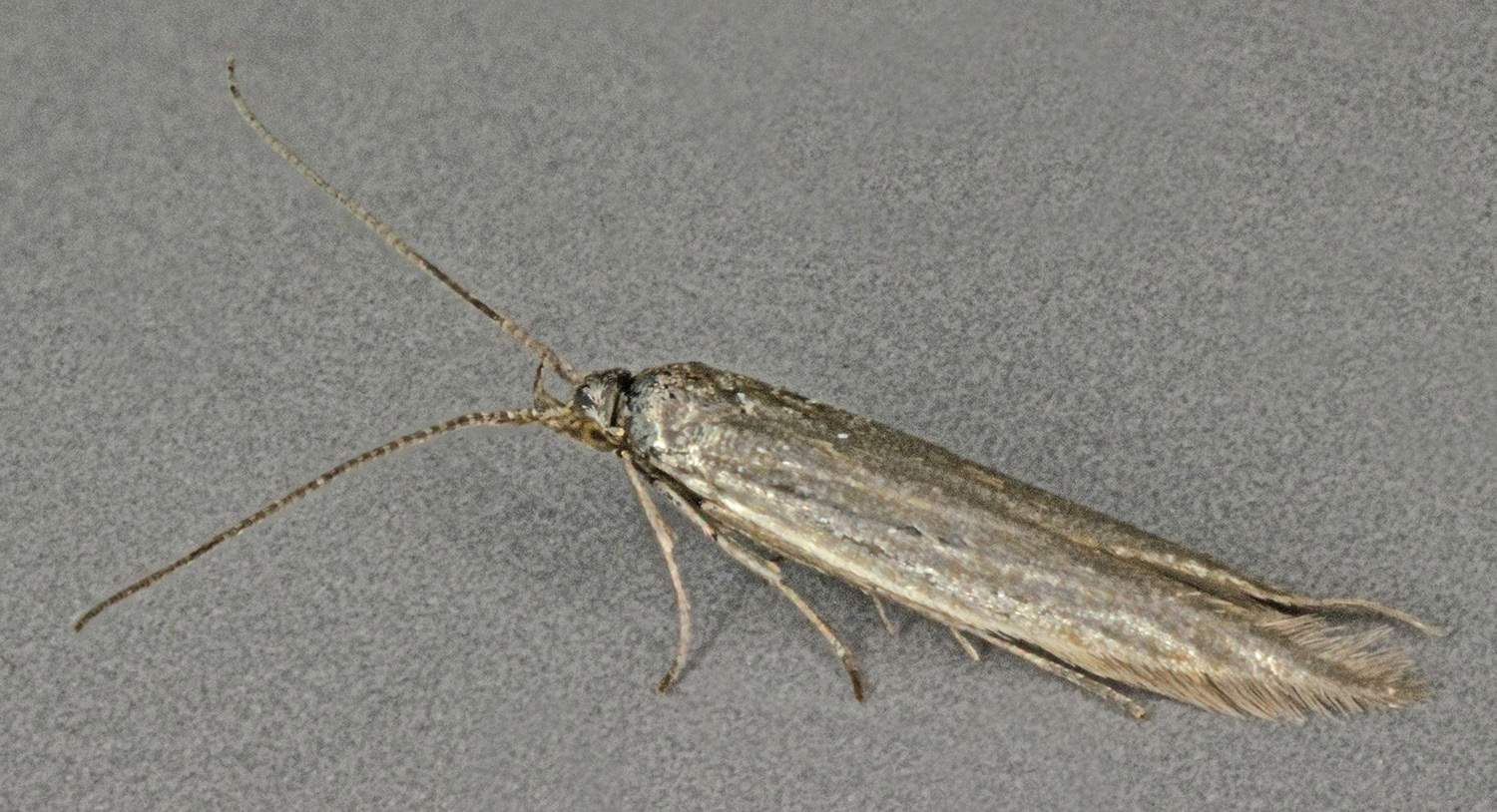
- Coleophora adjunctella, Ynys, North Wales
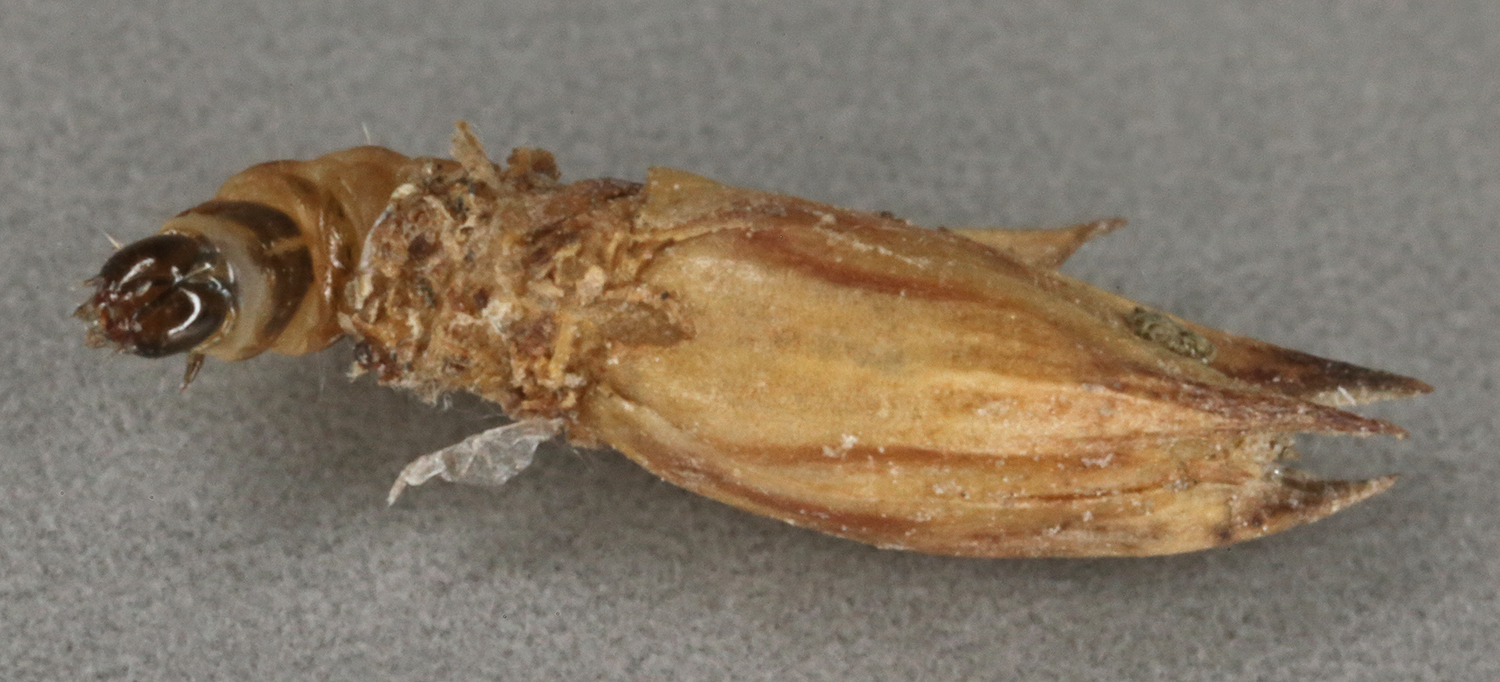
- Larva in seed pod case

Scientific classification
- Kingdom: Animalia
- Phylum: Arthropoda
- Class: Insecta
- Order: Lepidoptera
- Family: Coleophoridae
- Genus: Coleophora
- Species: C. adjunctella

Binomial name
- Coleophora adjunctella Hodgkinson, 1882

= Coleophora adjunctella =

Species of moth

Coleophora adjunctella is a moth of the family Coleophoridae found in Europe.

== Description ==
The wingspan is 8–10 mm (0.31–0.39 in). Coleophora species have narrow blunt to pointed forewings and a weakly defined tornus. The hindwings are narrow-elongate and very long-fringed. The upper surfaces have neither a discal spot nor transverse lines. Each abdomen segment of the abdomen has paired patches of tiny spines which show through the scales. The resting position is horizontal with the front end raised and the cilia give the hind tip a frayed and upturned look if the wings are rolled around the body. C. adjunctella characteristics include:- Head brownish. Antennae dark fuscous, faintly ringed anteriorly with whitish. Forewings rather dark shining greyish-brown; costa narrowly white to beyond middle. Hindwings grey.

There is one generation per year with adults on wing from late June to July in western Europe.

The larvae feed on saltmarsh rush (Juncus gerardii). Larvae can be found from August to May.

== Distribution ==
The moth is found from Fennoscandia and northern Russia to Romania, Italy and France and from Ireland to Ukraine and southern Russia.
