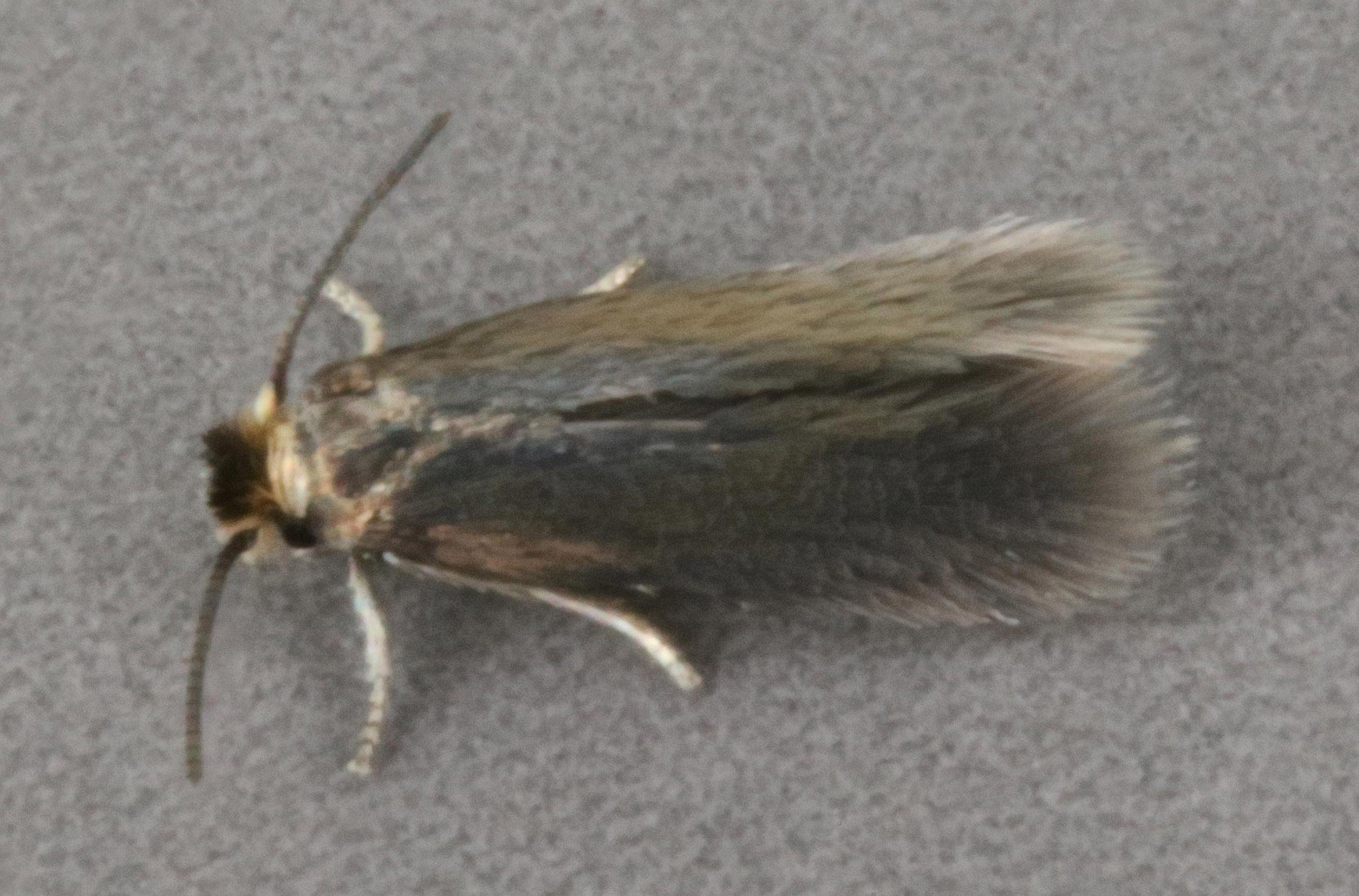

Scientific classification
- Kingdom: Animalia
- Phylum: Arthropoda
- Clade: Pancrustacea
- Class: Insecta
- Order: Lepidoptera
- Family: Nepticulidae
- Genus: Stigmella
- Species: S. spinosissimae

Binomial name
- Stigmella spinosissimae (Waters, 1928)

Synonyms
- Nepticula spinosissimae Waters, 1928

= Stigmella spinosissimae =

Species of moth

Stigmella spinosissimae is a moth of the family Nepticulidae. It is found in Great Britain and Ireland. It is also present in the eastern part of the Palearctic realm. It is essentially unicolorous and identification requires microscopic examination of the genitalia.

The larvae feed on Rosa pimpinellifolia and possibly other Rosa species.
