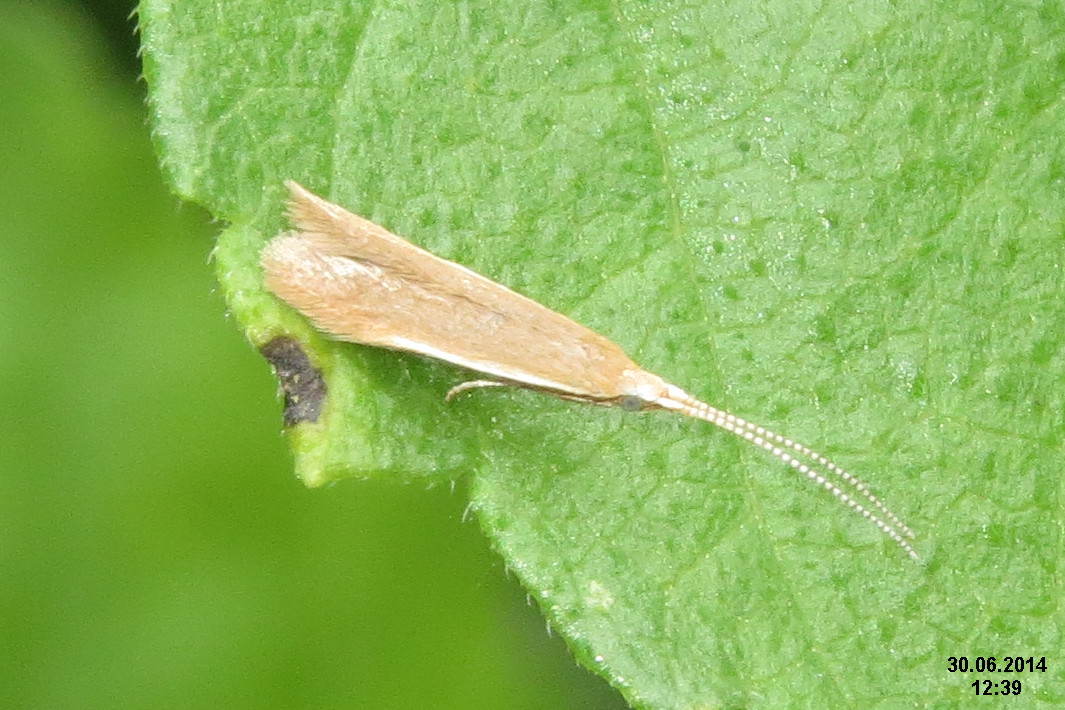

Scientific classification
- Kingdom: Animalia
- Phylum: Arthropoda
- Class: Insecta
- Order: Lepidoptera
- Family: Coleophoridae
- Genus: Coleophora
- Species: C. alnifoliae

Binomial name
- Coleophora alnifoliae Barasch, 1934

Synonyms
- Coleophora alnivorella McDunnough, 1946

= Coleophora alnifoliae =

Species of moth

Coleophora alnifoliae, the brown alder case-bearer, is a moth of the family Coleophoridae. C. alnifoliae is found in Europe, from Fennoscandia to the Pyrenees, Sardinia, Italy, Romania, Great Britain, Baltic States (Estonia, Latvia, Lithuania), Poland and North America (specifically Eastern United States and Canada). In Great Britain, it has been slowly expanding its range with scattered colonies in Southern England.

== Description ==
The wingspan is 12–13 mm. The moth flies from July to August depending on the location. This species has a general coloration of a golden-brown with a white leading edge to the forewing.
