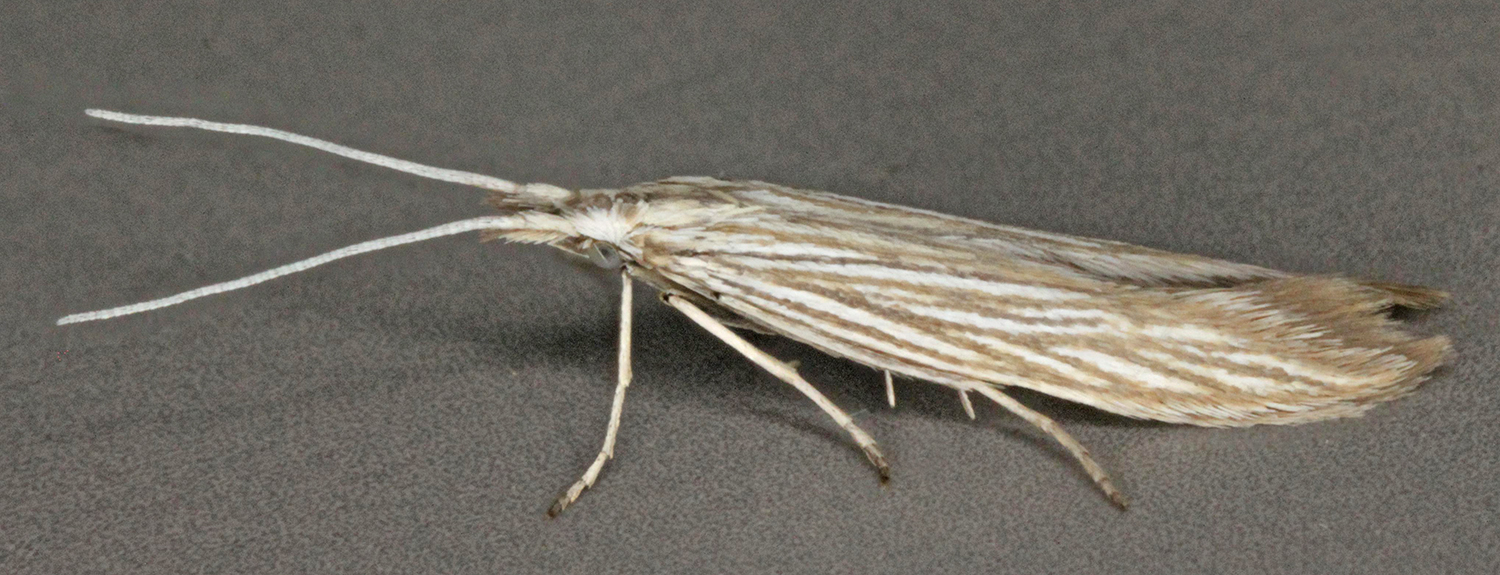

Scientific classification
- Kingdom: Animalia
- Phylum: Arthropoda
- Class: Insecta
- Order: Lepidoptera
- Family: Coleophoridae
- Genus: Coleophora
- Species: C. serpylletorum

Binomial name
- Coleophora serpylletorum Hering, 1889

Synonyms
- Amseliphora assisti Nemes, 2003

= Coleophora serpylletorum =

Species of moth

Coleophora serpylletorum is a moth of the family Coleophoridae found in Europe. It was first described by Erich Martin Hering in 1889.

== Description ==
The wingspan is about 9 mm.

The larvae feed on species of thyme such as Thymus praecox, Thymus odoratissimus and Thymus serpyllum. Full-grown larvae can be found in June.

== Distribution ==
It is found from Denmark and Latvia to Spain, Sardinia, Italy and Greece and from Great Britain to Romania. It is also present in northern Russia.
