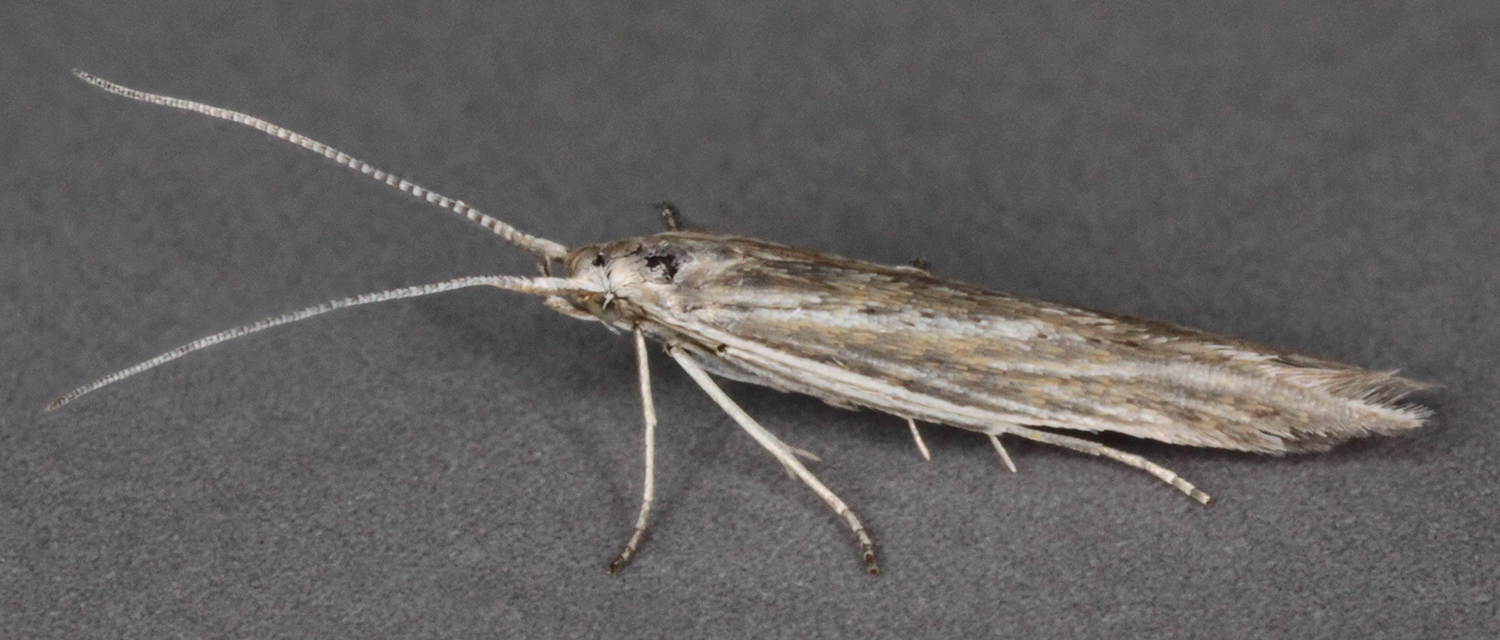

Scientific classification
- Kingdom: Animalia
- Phylum: Arthropoda
- Class: Insecta
- Order: Lepidoptera
- Family: Coleophoridae
- Genus: Coleophora
- Species: C. virgaureae

Binomial name
- Coleophora virgaureae Stainton, 1857

= Coleophora virgaureae =

Species of moth

Coleophora virgaureae is a moth of the family Coleophoridae. It is found from most of Europe (except the Balkan Peninsula) through the Caucasus, Kazakhstan and Siberia eastward to the Baikal area and the Altai in Russia and Japan.

The wingspan is 11–13 mm. A Coleophora with imagines that cannot be identified without dissection and microscopic examination of the genitalia.

Adults are on wing from August to September.

The larvae feed on European goldenrod (Solidago virgaurea) and sea aster (Aster tripolium).
