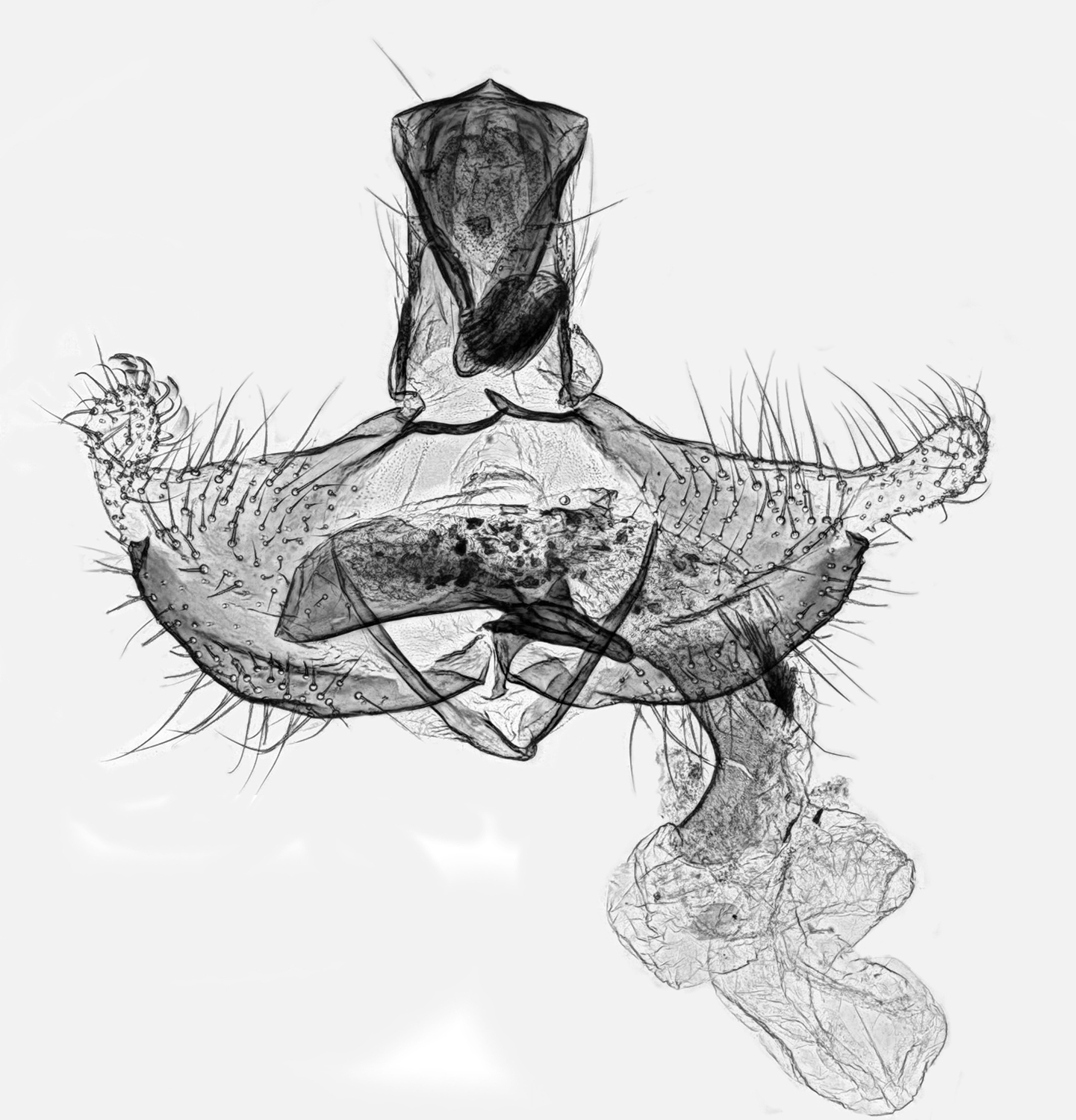
- Reliable identification only by dissection and microscopic examination of the genitalia.

Scientific classification
- Kingdom: Animalia
- Phylum: Arthropoda
- Class: Insecta
- Order: Lepidoptera
- Family: Coleophoridae
- Genus: Coleophora
- Species: C. orbitella

Binomial name
- Coleophora orbitella Zeller, 1849

= Coleophora orbitella =

Species of moth

Coleophora orbitella is a moth of the family Coleophoridae. It is found from Scandinavia and northern Russia to the Pyrenees and Italy and from Ireland to Poland and Hungary.

The wingspan is 10–14 mm. Coleophora species have narrow blunt to pointed forewings and a weakly defined tornus. The hindwings are narrow-elongate and very long-fringed. The upper surfaces have neither a discal spot nor transverse lines. Each abdomen segment of the abdomen has paired patches of tiny spines which show through the scales. The resting position is horizontal with the front end raised and the cilia give the hind tip a frayed and upturned look if the wings are rolled around the body. C. orbitella characteristics include:- Head shining fuscous. Antennae white, ringed with dark fuscous except on apical 1/3, basal joint fuscous. Forewings shining brown-grey. Hindwings dark grey.

Adults are on wing in one generation per year from late May to early July.

The larvae feed on alder (Alnus glutinosa), silver birch (Betula pendula), hornbeam (Carpinus betulus) and hazel (Corylus avellana). Larvae can be found from mid-August to the end of October, when they are full-grown.
