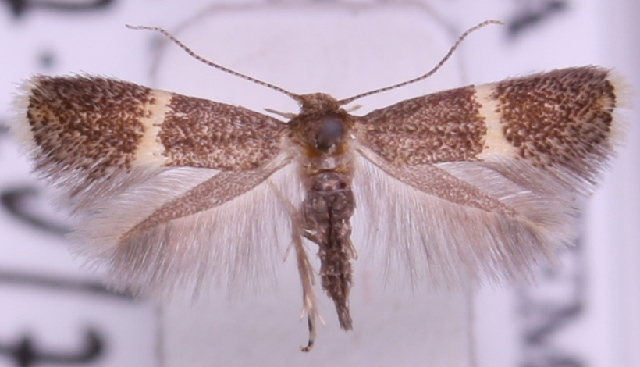

Scientific classification
- Kingdom: Animalia
- Phylum: Arthropoda
- Clade: Pancrustacea
- Class: Insecta
- Order: Lepidoptera
- Family: Elachistidae
- Genus: Elachista
- Species: E. obliquella

Binomial name
- Elachista obliquella Stainton, 1854

Synonyms
- Biselachista obliquella Traugott-Olsen & Nielsen, 1977; Cosmiotes obliquella Clemens, 1860

= Elachista obliquella =

Species of moth

Elachista obliquella is a moth of the family Elachistidae found in Europe.

== Description ==
The wingspan is 8–10 millimetres (0.31–0.39 in).The head is ochreous- whitish. Antennae whitish-ringed. Forewings light grey, irrorated with blackish;a nearly straight central whitish fascia, sometimes ochreous tinged, in male slenderer and sometimes interrupted; tips of apical cilia whitish. Hindwings are grey. The larva is grey-greenish; head pale brown; two with two brown spots.

== Biology ==
Adults are on wing from April to July and again in August in two generations per year.

== Distribution ==
It is found from Scandinavia to the Iberian Peninsula, Italy and Romania and from Ireland to Ukraine. It is also found in Russia.
