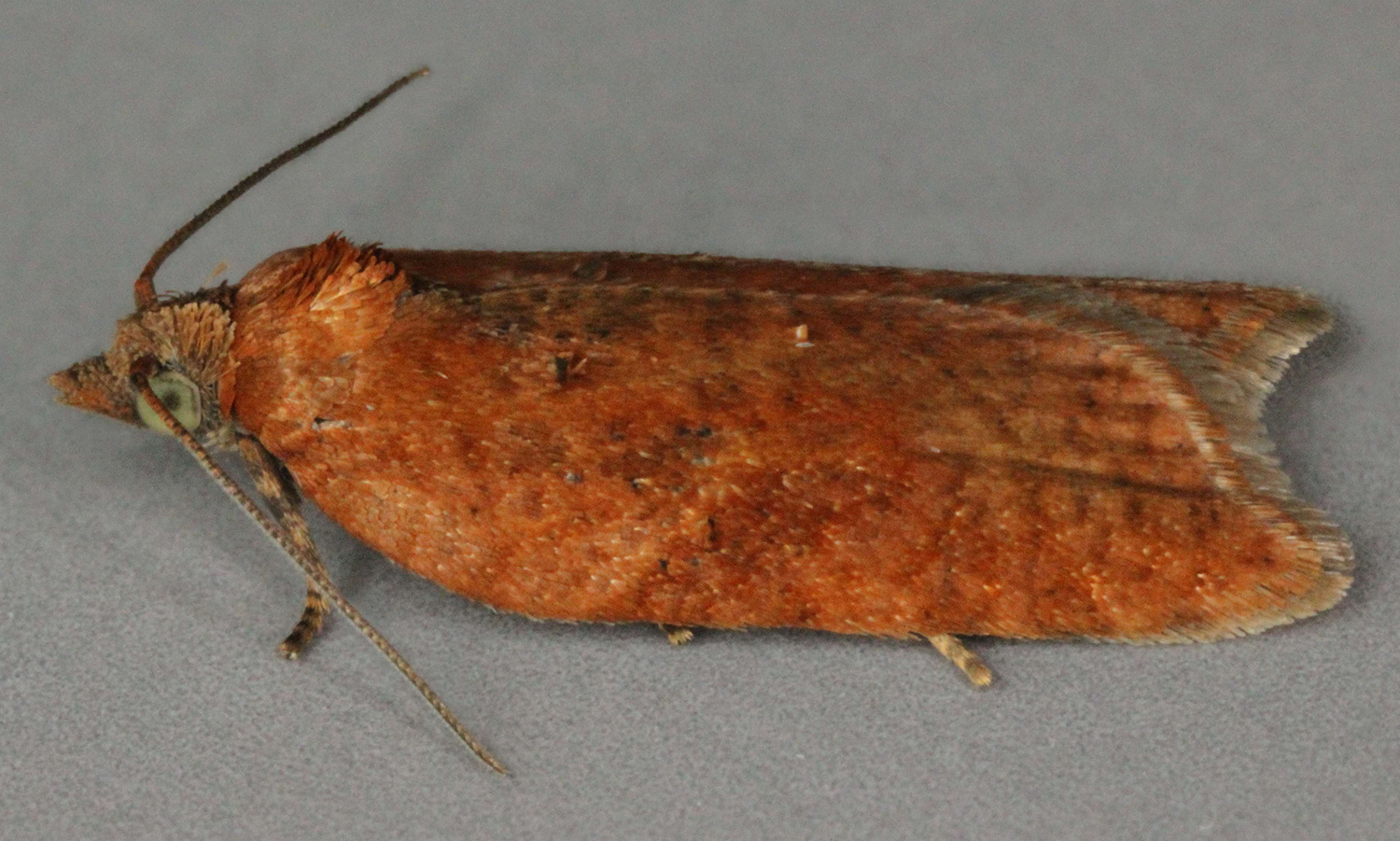
- Acleris caledoniana, North Wales

Scientific classification
- Kingdom: Animalia
- Phylum: Arthropoda
- Clade: Pancrustacea
- Class: Insecta
- Order: Lepidoptera
- Family: Tortricidae
- Genus: Acleris
- Species: A. caledoniana

Binomial name
- Acleris caledoniana (Stephens, 1852)

Synonyms
- Peronea caledoniana Stephens, 1852; Peronea calidoniana Kloet & Hincks, 1945; Peronea caledoniana ab. rufimaculana Sheldon, 1931

= Acleris caledoniana =

Species of moth

Acleris caledoniana, the Caledonian button, is a species of moth of the family Tortricidae. It is found in Ireland, Great Britain and Poland. It is found in high moorland, where it inhabits mountain bogs.

The wingspan is 13–15 mm. Very similar to Acleris comariana and Acleris laterana. The forewings are suboblong, ferruginous- fuscous, obscurely darker- strigulated; tufts slight; central fascia and costal patch sometimes faintly indicated. Hindwings grey. Certain identification requires examination of the genitalia. Julius von Kennel provides a description

Adults are on wing from July to September. It is a day-flying species.

The larvae feed on Alchemilla alpina, Myrica gale, Vaccinium myrtillus, Rubus and Potentilla species. They spin together the leaves or shoots of their host plant, feeding from within. Larvae can be found from June to July.
