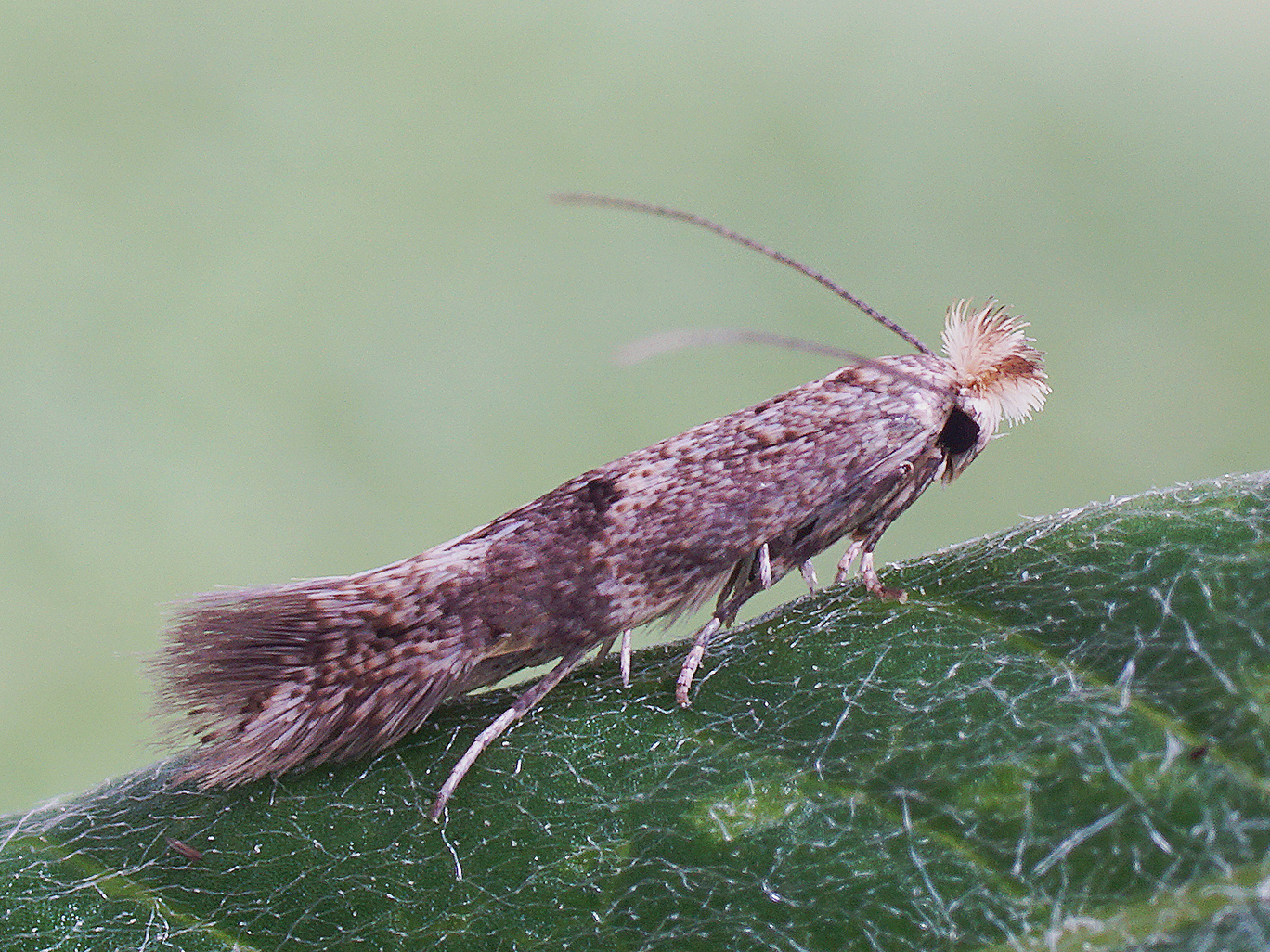

Scientific classification
- Kingdom: Animalia
- Phylum: Arthropoda
- Clade: Pancrustacea
- Class: Insecta
- Order: Lepidoptera
- Family: Bucculatricidae
- Genus: Bucculatrix
- Species: B. humiliella

Binomial name
- Bucculatrix humiliella Herrich-Schäffer, 1855

Synonyms
- Bucculatrix capreella Krogerus, 1952; Bucculatrix obscurella Klemensiewicz, 1899; Bucculatrix merei Pelham-Clinton, 1967

= Bucculatrix humiliella =

Species of moth

Bucculatrix humiliella is a moth of the family Bucculatricidae. It is found from Fennoscandia to the Pyrenees and the Alps and from Great Britain to Poland. It was described by Gottlieb August Wilhelm Herrich-Schäffer in 1855.

The wingspan is 8–9 mm.

The larvae feed on yarrow (Achillea millefolium) and tansy (Tanacetum vulgare). They mine the leaves of their host plant.
