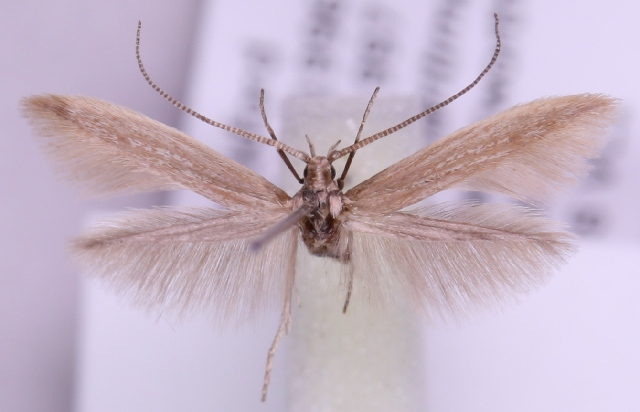

Scientific classification
- Kingdom: Animalia
- Phylum: Arthropoda
- Class: Insecta
- Order: Lepidoptera
- Family: Coleophoridae
- Genus: Coleophora
- Species: C. deviella

Binomial name
- Coleophora deviella Zeller, 1847

Synonyms
- Coleophora suaedivora Meyrick, 1928; Coleophora maeniacella Toll, 1952

= Coleophora deviella =

Species of moth

Coleophora deviella is a moth of the family Coleophoridae. It is found from Denmark to Spain, Sardinia, Sicily and Greece and from Great Britain to southern Russia. It occurs in desert-steppe and desert biotopes.

The wingspan is 9–10 mm. There is one generation per year with adults on wing from late June to July in western Europe and from late May to June in Russia.
