= Cosmopterix scribaiella =

Scientific classification
- Kingdom: Animalia
- Phylum: Arthropoda
- Clade: Pancrustacea
- Class: Insecta
- Order: Lepidoptera
- Family: Cosmopterigidae
- Genus: Cosmopterix
- Species: C. scribaiella

Binomial name
- Cosmopterix scribaiella Zeller, 1850

Synonyms
- Cosmopteryx scribaiella Frey, 1856; Cosmopteryx hermsiella E. Hering, 1889

Species of moth

Cosmopterix scribaiella is a moth of the family Cosmopterigidae. It is found from most of Europe (except the Balkan Peninsula) to Japan.

The wingspan is about 10 mm. Adults are on wing from late June to October in western Europe.

The larvae feed on Phragmites australis. They mine the leaves of their host plant.

== Subspecies ==
- Cosmopterix scribaiella scribaiella
- Cosmopterix scribaiella japonica Kuroko, 1960 (Japan)
