= Phyllonorycter ulicicolella =

Scientific classification
- Kingdom: Animalia
- Phylum: Arthropoda
- Clade: Pancrustacea
- Class: Insecta
- Order: Lepidoptera
- Family: Gracillariidae
- Genus: Phyllonorycter
- Species: P. ulicicolella

Binomial name
- Phyllonorycter ulicicolella (Stainton, 1851)

Synonyms
- Lithocolletis ulicicolella Stainton, 1851

Species of moth

Phyllonorycter ulicicolella is a moth of the family Gracillariidae. It is known from Great Britain, Spain, France, Italy and Greece.

The wingspan is 6–8 mm. The forewings are shining golden ochreous; a white median streak from base to near middle; four short costal and three dorsal shining white wedge-shaped spots, first dorsal long, second broad; a black apical strigula; a black line in cilia. Hindwings are grey.

Adults are on wing from June to August.

The larvae feed on Ulex species. They mine the spines, shoots or bark of their host plant.
