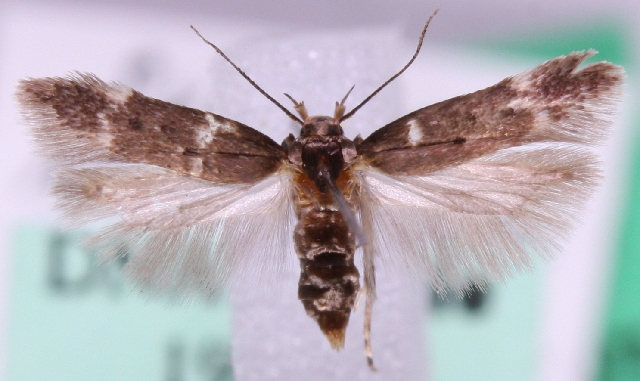

Scientific classification
- Kingdom: Animalia
- Phylum: Arthropoda
- Clade: Pancrustacea
- Class: Insecta
- Order: Lepidoptera
- Family: Gelechiidae
- Genus: Bryotropha
- Species: B. umbrosella

Binomial name
- Bryotropha umbrosella (Zeller, 1839)

Synonyms
- Gelechia umbrosella Zeller, 1839; Gelechia mundella Douglas, 1850; Gelechia portlandicella Richardson, 1890; Bryotropha umbrosella r. fulvipalpella de Joannis, 1909; Gelechia anacampsoidella Hering, 1924

= Bryotropha umbrosella =

Species of moth

Bryotropha umbrosella is a moth of the family Gelechiidae. It is found in open dune areas throughout most of north-western Europe. In southern Europe, it is only known from one record from Spain.

They are known to have a wingspan is 9–11 mm. Terminal joint of palpi as long as second, or somewhat longer. Forewings dark fuscous, slightly purplish-tinged; stigmata black, each sometimes followed by whitish scales, first discal beyond plical; a small white spot on tornus, and another on costa opposite. Hindwings light grey.

Larvae live in a silken tube amongst Ceratodon purpureus. They have also been observed eating grass.
