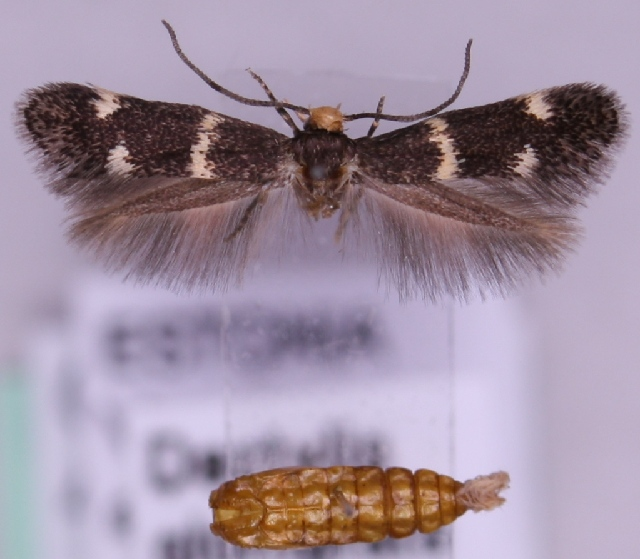

Scientific classification
- Domain: Eukaryota
- Kingdom: Animalia
- Phylum: Arthropoda
- Class: Insecta
- Order: Lepidoptera
- Family: Elachistidae
- Genus: Elachista
- Species: E. luticomella

Binomial name
- Elachista luticomella Zeller, 1839

= Elachista luticomella =

Species of moth

Elachista luticomella is a moth of the family Elachistidae. It is found in most of Europe.

The wingspan is 10–11 millimetres (0.39–0.43 in). The moth flies from June to August depending on the location. The head is light ochreous-yellow, seldom with a fuscous spot. Forewings are dark fuscous; a somewhat oblique fascia before middle, a small tornal spot, and another on costa beyond it ochreous-whitish, in female enlarged and more conspicuous. Hindwings are blackish grey. The larva is pale yellow; head pale brown.
