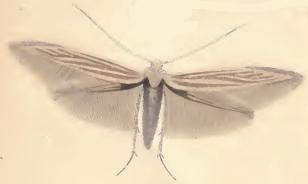

Scientific classification
- Kingdom: Animalia
- Phylum: Arthropoda
- Class: Insecta
- Order: Lepidoptera
- Family: Coleophoridae
- Genus: Coleophora
- Species: C. artemisicolella

Binomial name
- Coleophora artemisicolella Bruand, [1855]

Synonyms
- Coleophora albicans sensu auct., nec Zeller, 1849

= Coleophora artemisicolella =

Species of moth

Coleophora artemisicolella is a moth of the family Coleophoridae found in Europe and across the Palearctic.

== Description ==
The wingspan is 11–13 mm. Adults are on wing from July to August.

The larvae feed on mugwort (Artemisia vulgaris).

== Distribution ==
It is found from Fennoscandia to the Pyrenees, Italy, and Bulgaria, and from Great Britain to central and southern Russia, further east to Japan.
