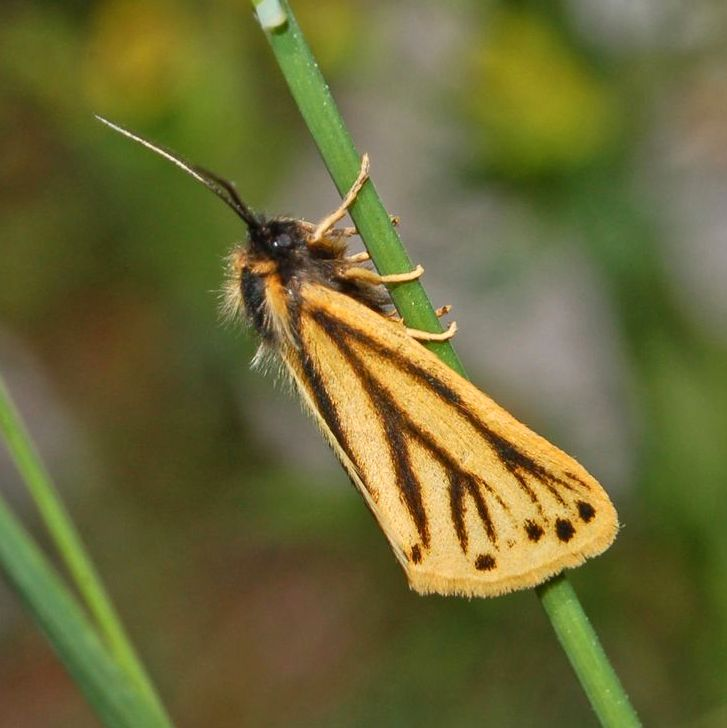
- Lateral view

Scientific classification
- Domain: Eukaryota
- Kingdom: Animalia
- Phylum: Arthropoda
- Class: Insecta
- Order: Lepidoptera
- Superfamily: Noctuoidea
- Family: Erebidae
- Subfamily: Arctiinae
- Genus: Setina
- Species: S. aurita

Binomial name
- Setina aurita (Esper, 1787)

Synonyms
- List: Bombyx compluta Hubner, 1803; Bombyx compluta Hübner, [1803]; Bombyx imbuta Hübner, [1803]; Bombyx ramosa Fabricius, 1793; Bombyx ramosa Fabricius, 1793; Endrosa arterica Turati, 1914; Endrosa aurita modesta Thomann, 1951; Endrosa aurita tecticola Thomann, 1951; Endrosa roscida f. transversa Vorbrodt, 1921; Endrosa teriolensis Burmann, 1955; Noctua avrita [aurita] Esper, 1787; Setina artericaeformis (Thomann, 1951); Setina atrophila (Schawerda, 1942); Setina aurita var. sagittata Frey, 1882; Setina complutoides Srrand, 1920; Setina fuliginosa (Blacher, 1910); Setina intermedia (Thomann, 1951); Setina marginata Rocci, 1914; Setina modesta (Thomann, 1951); Setina obliterata (Dannehl, 1929); Setina ramosa var. catherinei Oberthür, 1908; Setina seminigra Rocci, 1914; Setina semipunctata Rocci, 1914; Setina sulphurea (Thomann, 1951); Setina tecticola (Thomann, 1951); Setina transiens Thomann, 1951; Setina transversa Vorbrodt, 1921; Tinea irrorella Sulzer, 1776

= Setina aurita =

Species of moth

Setina aurita is a moth of the family Erebidae. It was first described by Eugenius Johann Christoph Esper in 1787.

== Subspecies ==
- Setina aurita aurita
- Setina aurita imbuta (Hübner, [1803])
- Setina aurita pfisteri Burmann et Tarmann, 1985
- Setina aurita teriolensis (Burmann, 1955)

== Distribution and habitat ==
This species is only found in central Europe (Austria, France, Germany, Italy, Romania and Switzerland), in part of the Alps between 1,000 and 3,000 meters above sea level. These moths inhabit stony alpine grasslands, rocky slope and sunny meadows.

== Description ==
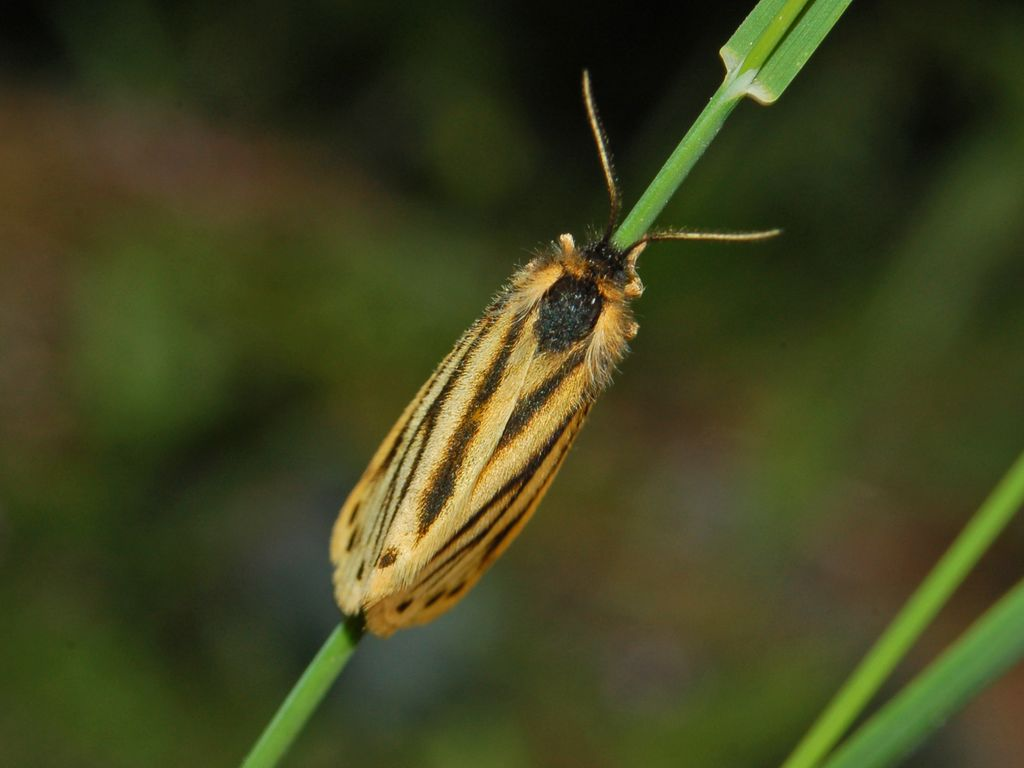
Dorsal view

The wingspan of Setina aurita can reach 25–32 mm. These small moths have whitish-yellow to orange-yellow forewings with longitudinal dark brown stripes reaching the wings' margins, where there are black dots. In some specimens only black dots are present on the entire wings. The wing drawing is strongly dependent on the altitude. Usually the moths living at more than 2,000 meters show stripes, while at lower elevation they are more dotted. Caterpillars can reach a length of about 22 millimetres (0.87 in). They are exceptionally long haired, yellow, with five longitudinal grayish-black stripes and grayish-black warts. The head is black.

This species is quite similar to the dew moth (Setina irrorella) and Setina roscida.

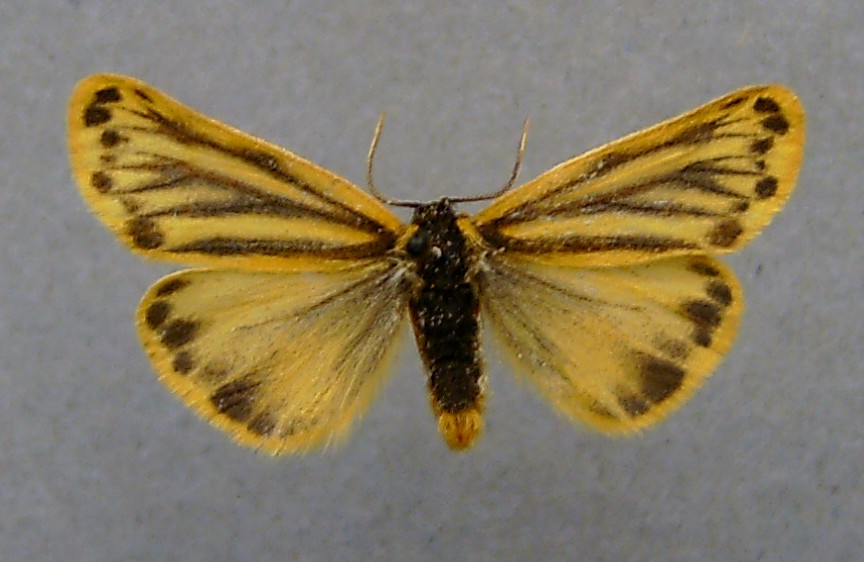
Mounted specimen

== Biology ==
Adults of these day-flying moths can be found from April to October depending on the elevation. The females lay their eggs on stones and rocks. The caterpillars live and pupate usually under rocks. The larvae feed on yellow lichens (Xanthoria parietina) and other lichen species growing on the rocks. This species overwinters, often two or three times, as caterpillars, that are active on mild winter days.

Setina aurita, like other species belonging to the genus Setina, is known to emit ultrasounds (a crackling noise) during flight, with the function of courtship signals.

== Bibliography ==
- Esper, E. J. C. 1786. Die Schmetterlinge in Abbildungen nach der Natur mit Beschreibungen. Vierter Theil. Europäische Gattungen. - pp. 1–372. Erlangen. (Walther)
- Heiko Bellmann: Der Neue Kosmos Schmetterlingsführer, Schmetterlinge, Raupen und Futterpflanzen, Franckh-Kosmos Verlags-GmbH & Co, Stuttgart 2003, ISBN 3-440-09330-1
