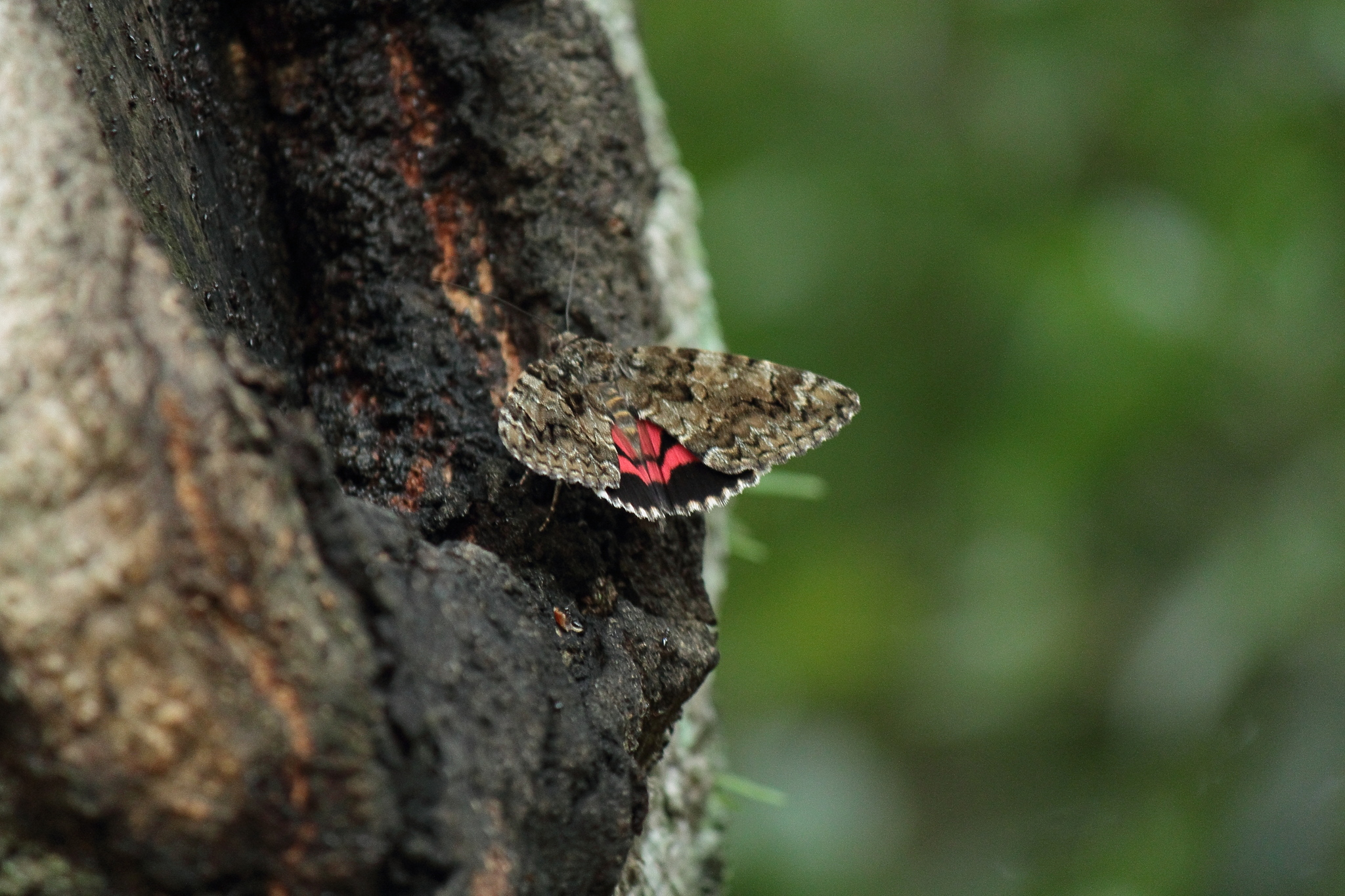

Scientific classification
- Domain: Eukaryota
- Kingdom: Animalia
- Phylum: Arthropoda
- Class: Insecta
- Order: Lepidoptera
- Superfamily: Noctuoidea
- Family: Erebidae
- Genus: Catocala
- Species: C. dula

Binomial name
- Catocala dula Bremer, 1861

Synonyms
- Mormonia dula carminea Mell, 1939

= Catocala dula =

Species of moth

Catocala dula is a moth of the family Erebidae. It is found in Russia, Japan, Korea and China.

The wingspan is about 65 mm.

== Subspecies ==
- Catocala dula dula
- Catocala dula carminea (Mell, 1939)
