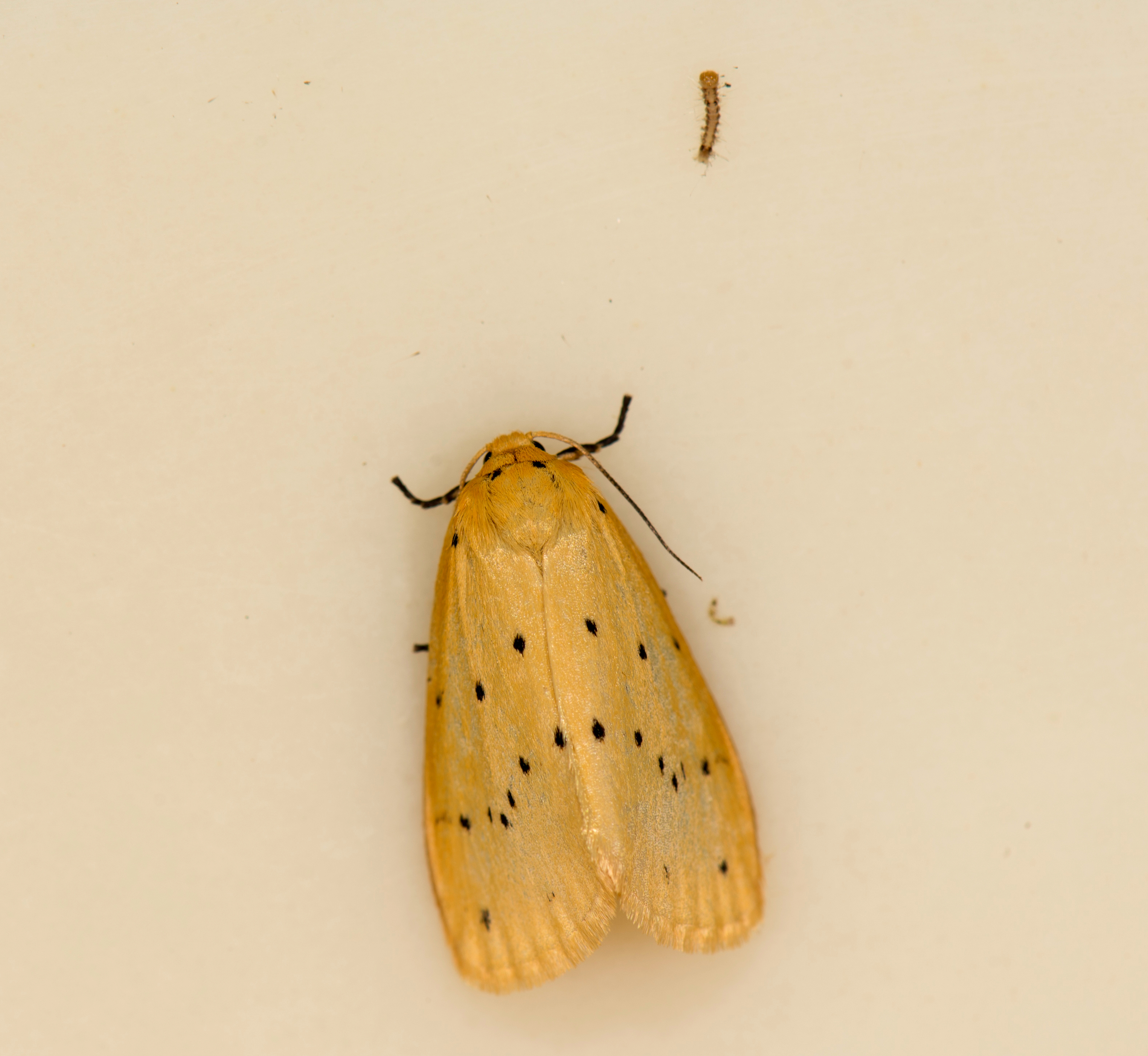

Scientific classification
- Kingdom: Animalia
- Phylum: Arthropoda
- Class: Insecta
- Order: Lepidoptera
- Superfamily: Noctuoidea
- Family: Erebidae
- Subfamily: Arctiinae
- Genus: Stigmatophora
- Species: S. flava

Binomial name
- Stigmatophora flava (Bremer & Grey, 1852)

Synonyms
- Setina flava Bremer & Grey, 1852; Setina sinensis Walker, 1854; Setina ochracea Lederer, 1855

= Stigmatophora flava =

Species of moth

Stigmatophora flava is a moth in the subfamily Arctiinae. It was described by Otto Vasilievich Bremer and William Grey in 1852. It is found in Kazakhstan, Russia (southern Siberia, Amur, Primorye), China, Korea and Japan.
