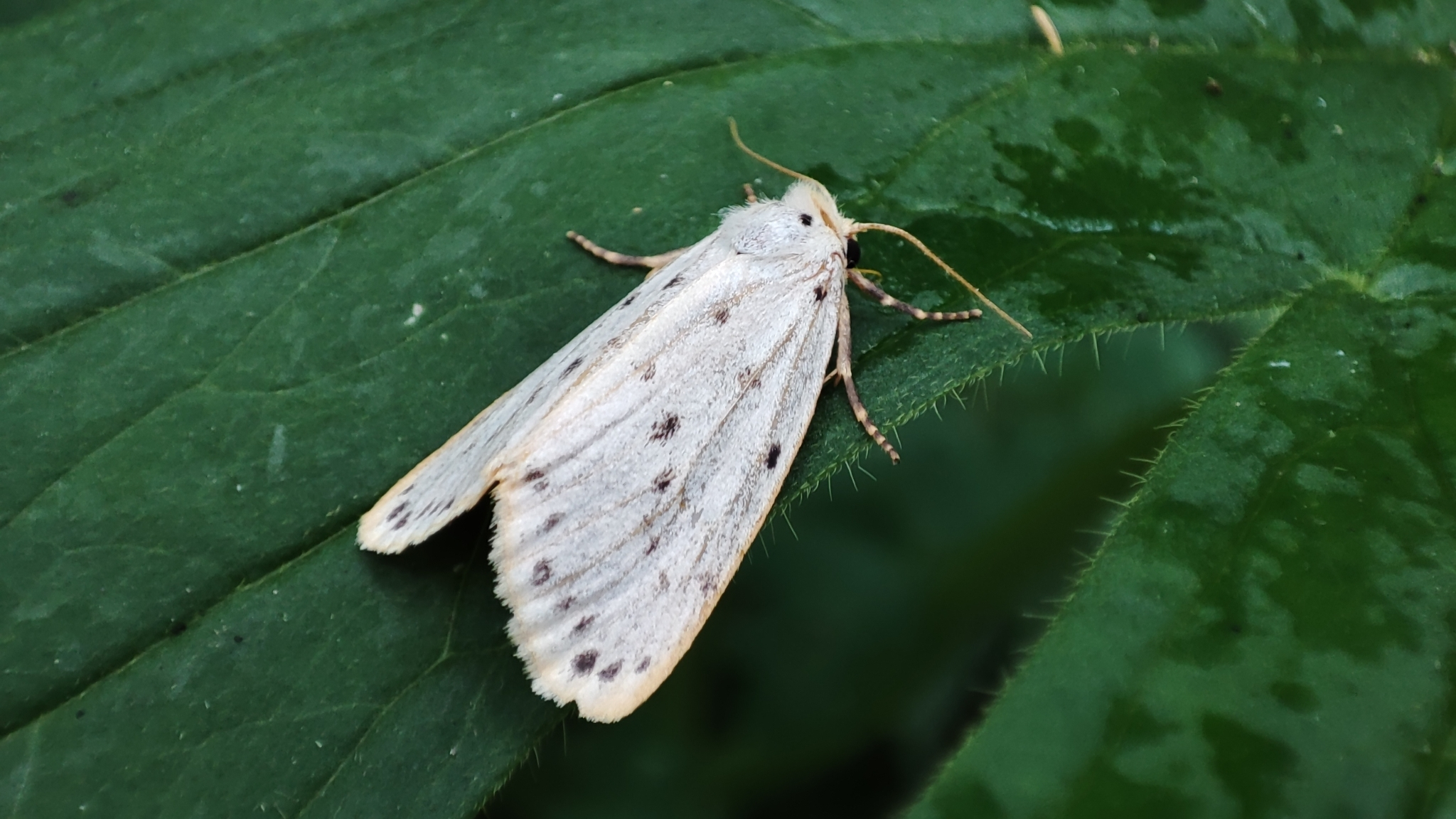

Scientific classification
- Kingdom: Animalia
- Phylum: Arthropoda
- Class: Insecta
- Order: Lepidoptera
- Superfamily: Noctuoidea
- Family: Erebidae
- Subfamily: Arctiinae
- Genus: Stigmatophora
- Species: S. micans

Binomial name
- Stigmatophora micans (Bremer & Grey, 1852)

Synonyms
- Setina micans Bremer & Grey, 1852; Setina albosericea Moore, 1877

= Stigmatophora micans =

Species of moth

Stigmatophora micans is a moth in the subfamily Arctiinae. It was described by Otto Vasilievich Bremer and William Grey in 1852. It is found in north-eastern Kazakhstan, Russia (southern Siberia to southern Jakutia, Amur, Primorye), Mongolia, China (Heilongjiang, Liaonin, Hebei, Henan, Shanxi, Shaanxi, Jiangsu, Gansu, Sichuan) and Korea.
