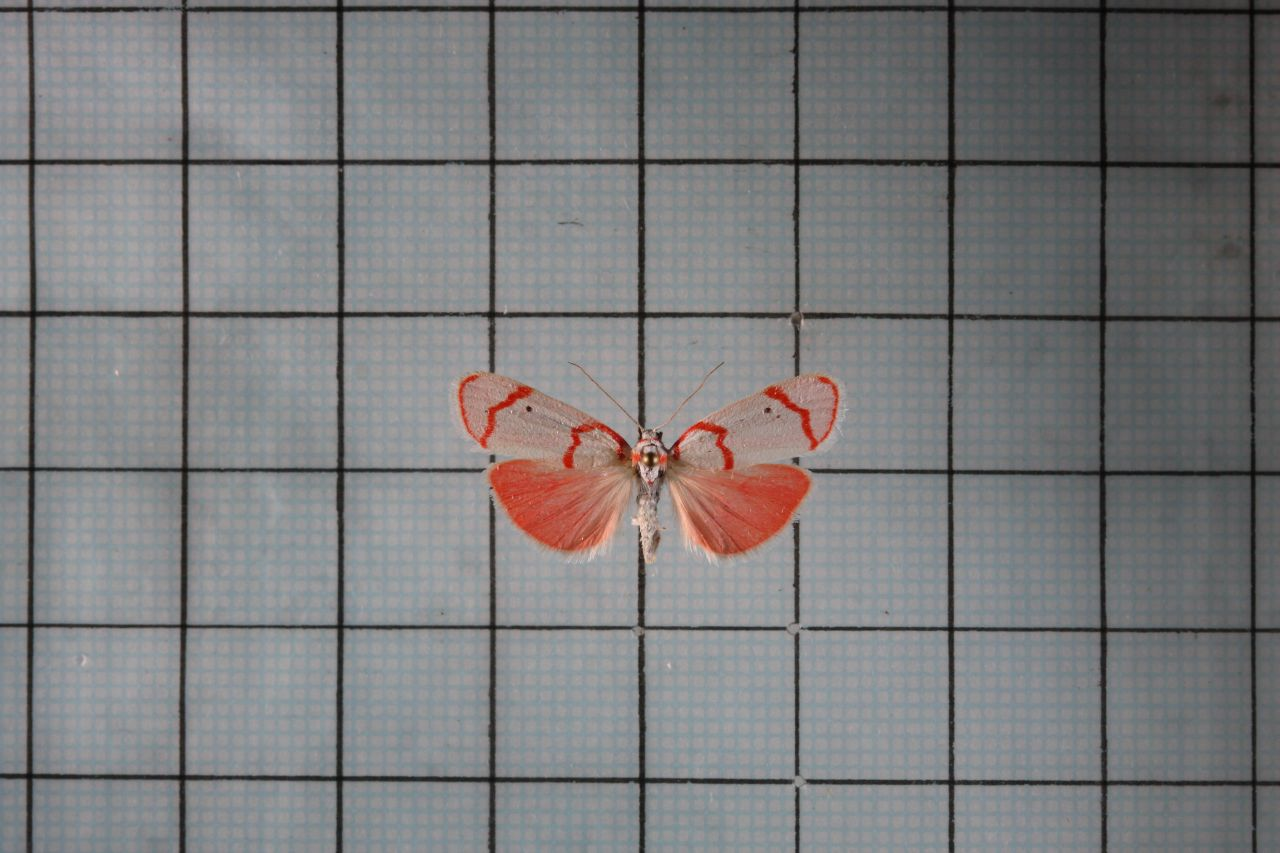

Scientific classification
- Domain: Eukaryota
- Kingdom: Animalia
- Phylum: Arthropoda
- Class: Insecta
- Order: Lepidoptera
- Superfamily: Noctuoidea
- Family: Erebidae
- Subfamily: Arctiinae
- Genus: Cyana
- Species: C. sanguinea

Binomial name
- Cyana sanguinea (Bremer & Grey, 1852)

Synonyms
- Calligenia sanguinea Bremer & Grey, 1852; Bizone cruenta Leech, 1890; Bizone dubenskii Alphéraky, 1892

= Cyana sanguinea =

Species of moth

Cyana sanguinea is a moth of the family Erebidae first described by Otto Vasilievich Bremer and William Grey in 1852. It is found in Taiwan and China.

The wingspan is 23–32 mm.
