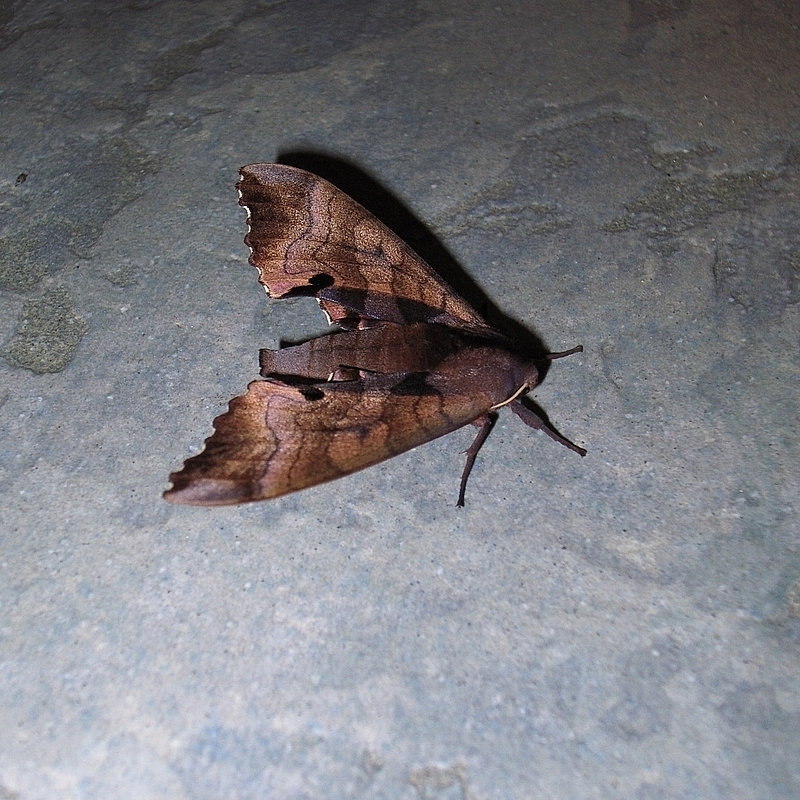

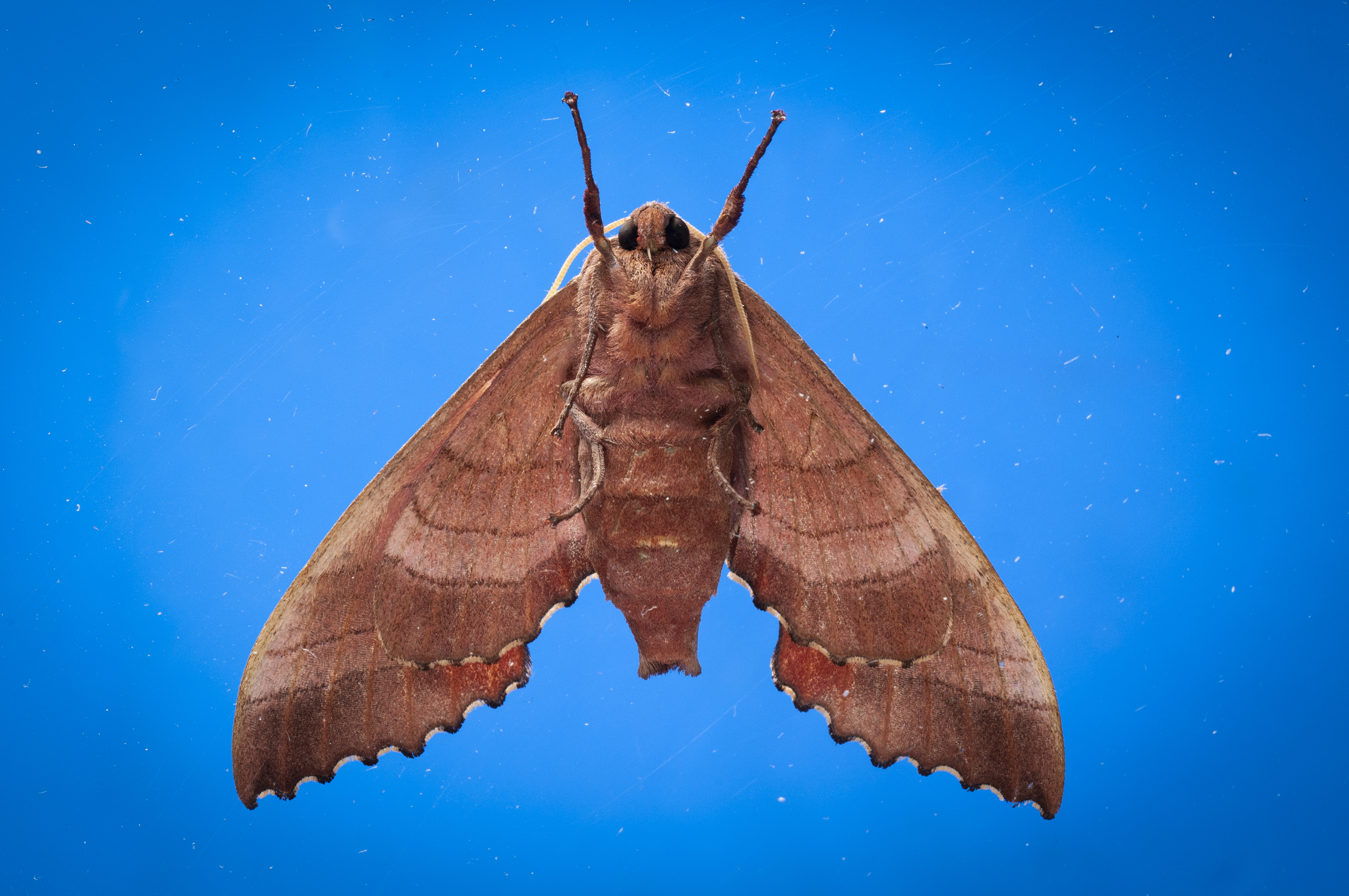
- Marumba gaschkewitschii (Ventral View), Adult, South Korea

Scientific classification
- Kingdom: Animalia
- Phylum: Arthropoda
- Clade: Pancrustacea
- Class: Insecta
- Order: Lepidoptera
- Family: Sphingidae
- Genus: Marumba
- Species: M. gaschkewitschii

Binomial name
- Marumba gaschkewitschii (Bremer & Grey, 1853)

Synonyms
- Smerinthus gaschkewitschii Bremer & Grey, 1853; Marumba gaschkevitshi Kuznetsova, 1906; Marumba omei Clark, 1936; Marumba fortis Jordan, 1929; Smerinthus heynei Austaut, 1892; Smerinthus maasseni Staudinger, 1892; Triptogon roseipennis Butler, 1875; Marumba gaschkewitschii coreana Clark, 1937; Marumba gaschkewitschii koreumba Bryk, 1946; Smerinthus gaschkewitschii carstanjeni Staudinger, 1887; Smerinthus gaschkewitschii complacens Walker, 1865; Smerinthus gaschkewitschii echephron Boisduval, 1875

= Marumba gaschkewitschii =

Species of moth

Marumba gaschkewitschii is a species of moth of the family Sphingidae first described by Otto Vasilievich Bremer and William (Wasilii) Grey in 1853. It is found in eastern Asia (see subspecies section).

== Description ==
The wingspan is 70–92 mm.

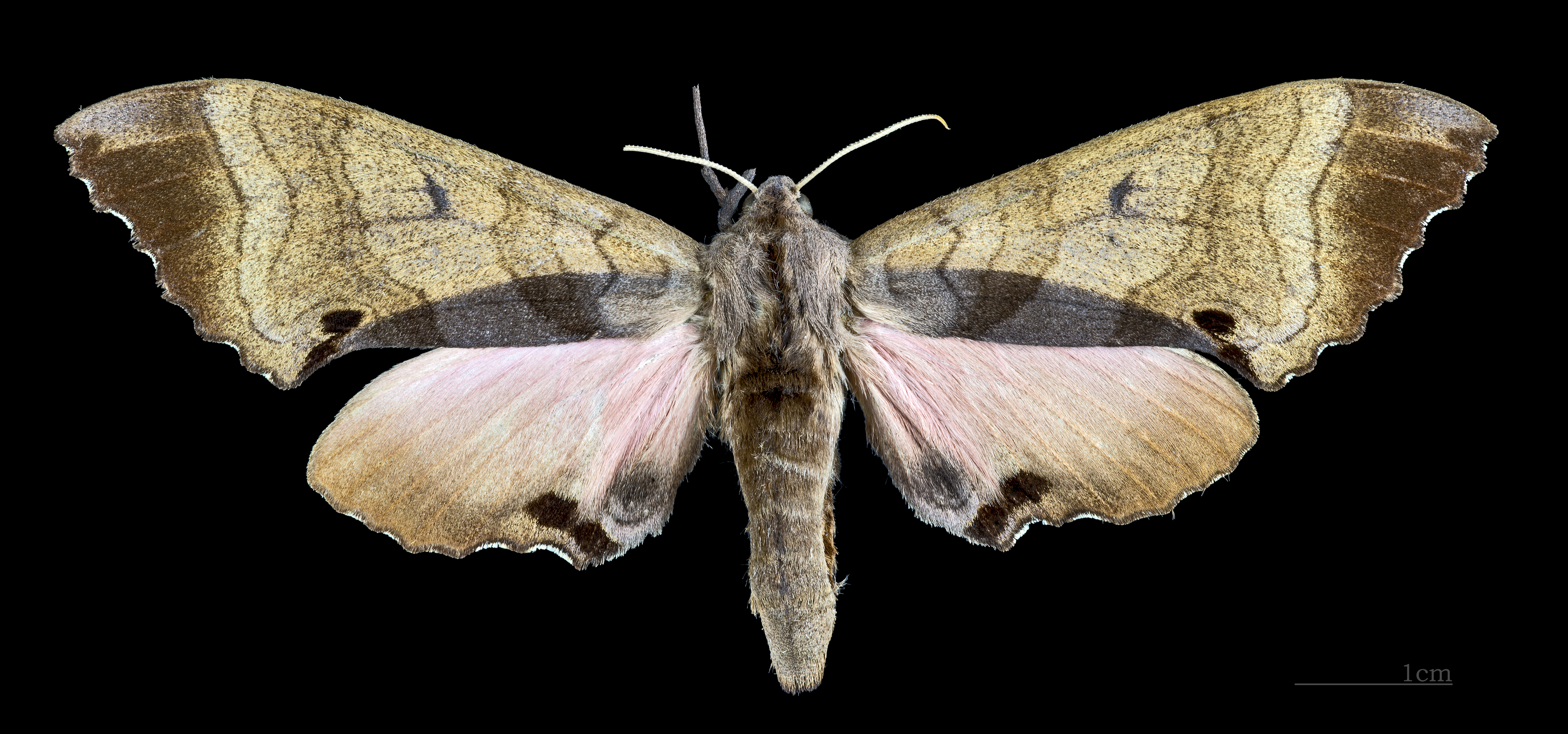
Female M. g. echephron

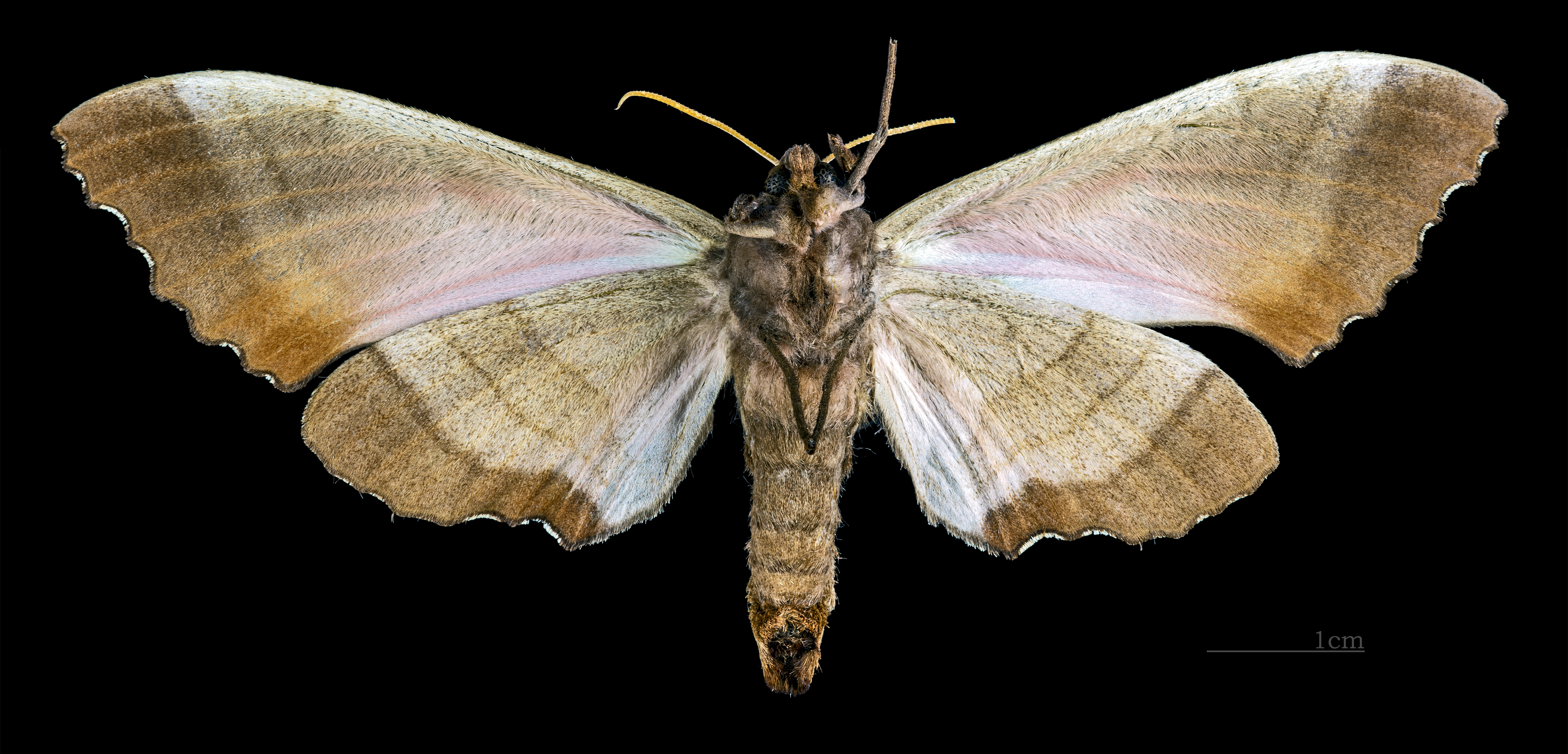
Female M. g. echephron, underside

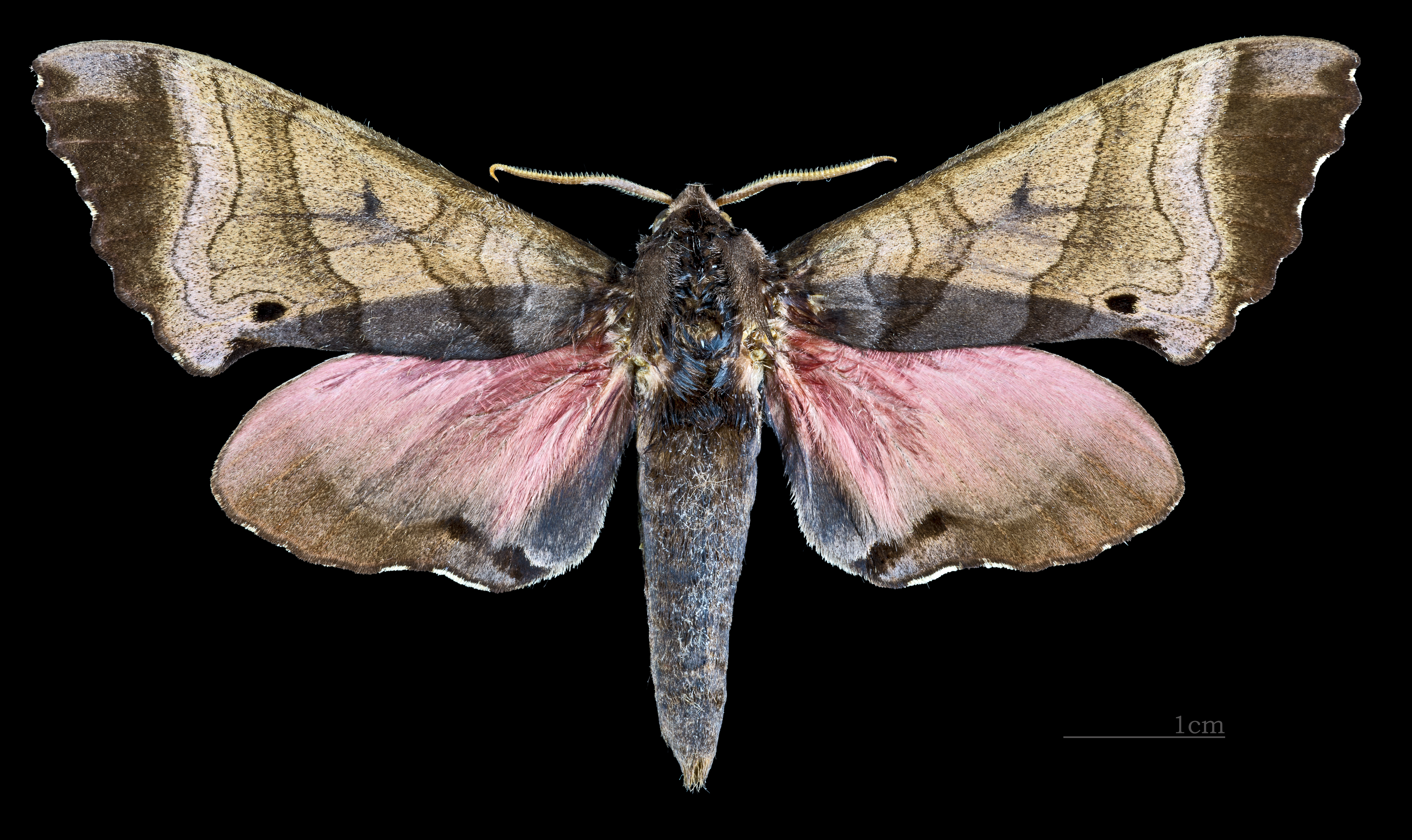
Male M. g. echephron

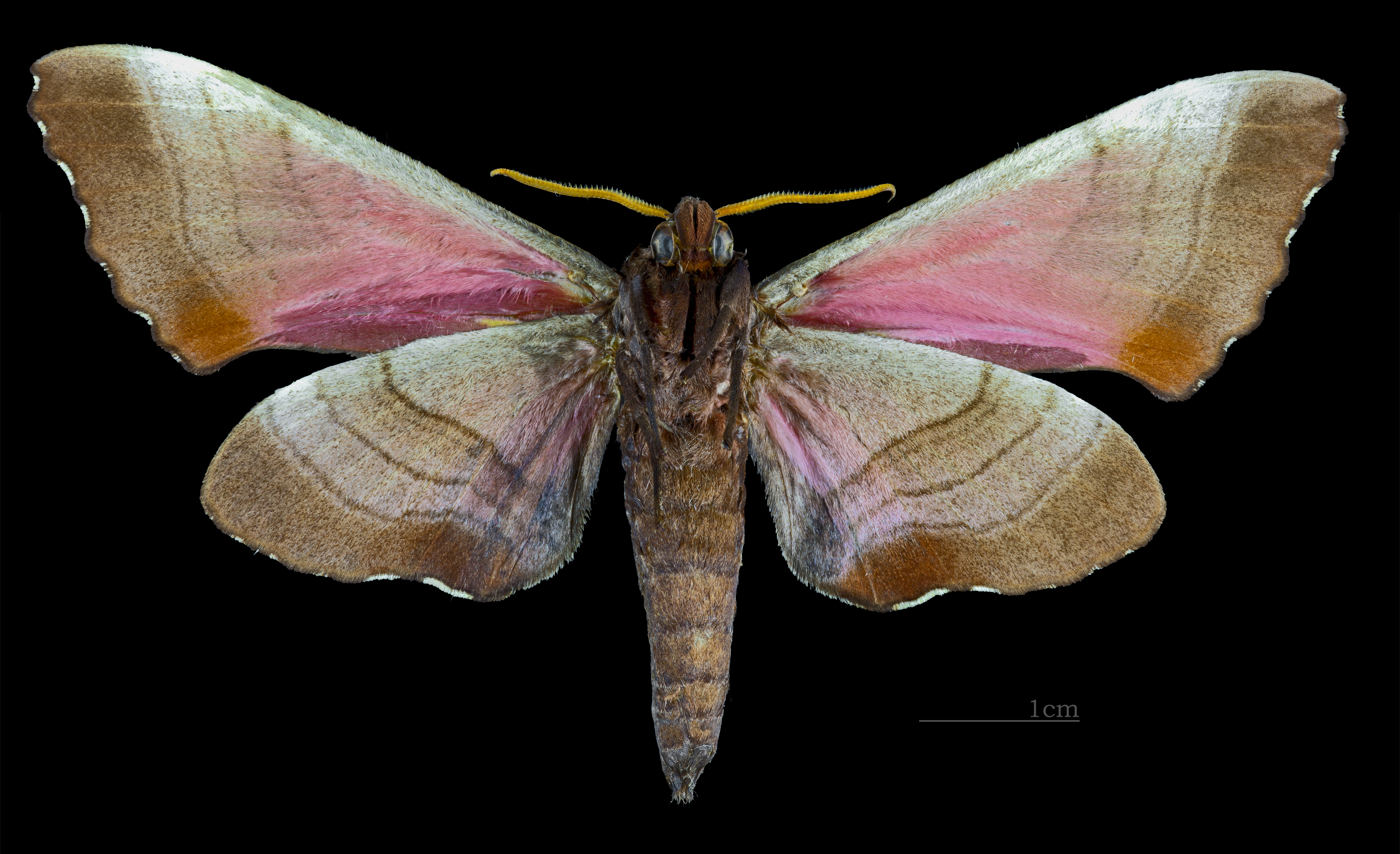
Male M. g. echephron, underside

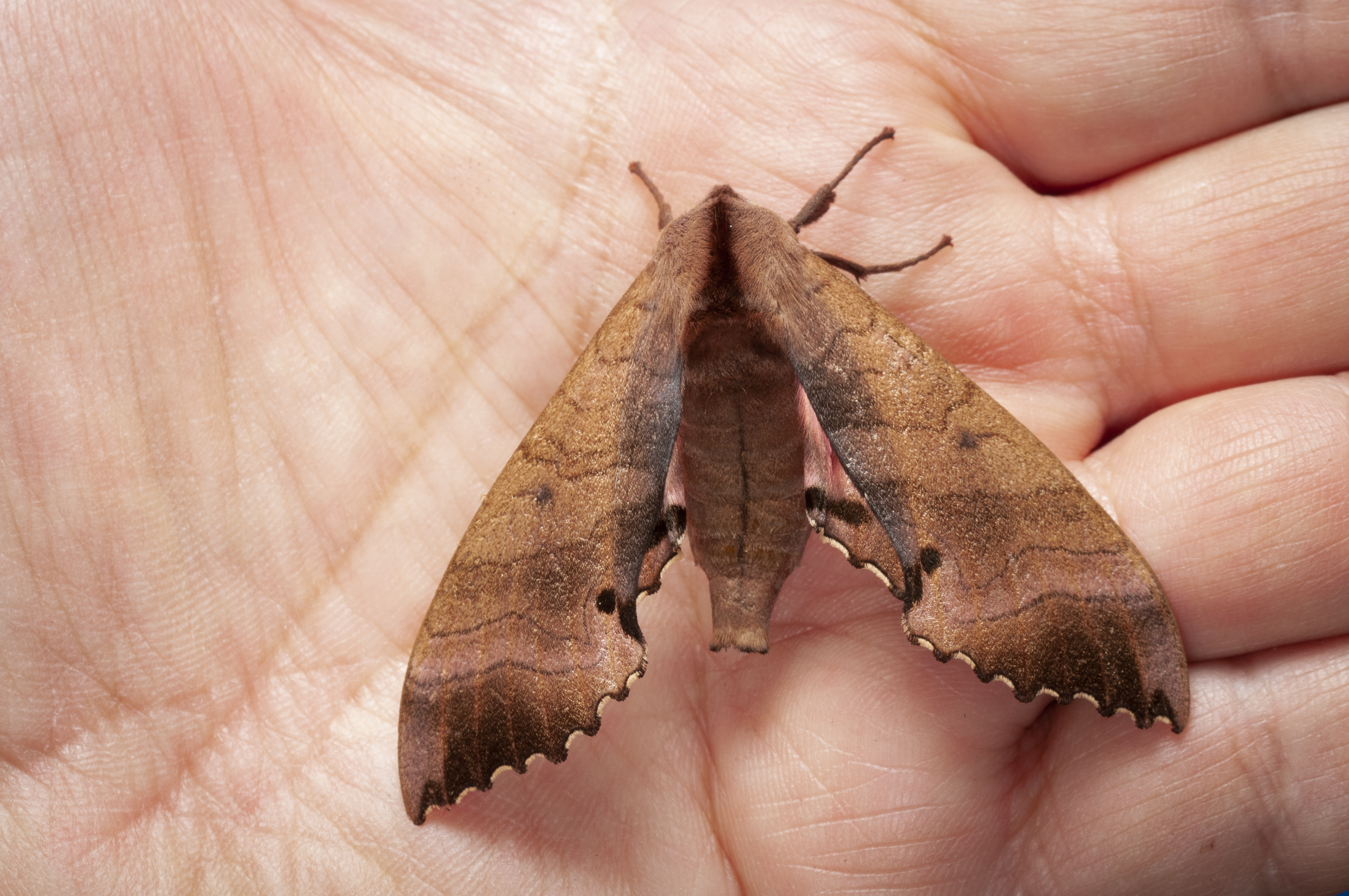
Marumba gaschkewitschii (Dorsal view)

== Biology ==
Adults are on wing from mid-May to late August in Korea. There are one to three generations per year.

Larvae have been recorded on Eriobotrya japonica and various Malus, Prunus and Pyrus species. It is considered a pest on Prunus mume. Most host plants are from the family Rosaceae, but there are also records for subspecies M. g. irata feeding on Salix. There are also confirmed records on Ziziphus mauritiana and Prunus armeniaca.

== Subspecies ==
- Marumba gaschkewitschii gaschkewitschii (lowlands of eastern China, from Beijing and Shandong south to the Yangtze River)
- Marumba gaschkewitschii complacens (central and south-eastern China, from Ningxia and Shaanxi south to Sichuan, then east to Shanghai, Zhejiang and Fujian and south through Guangdong, Hong Kong and Guangxi to northern Vietnam)
- Marumba gaschkewitschii echephron (Japan (Hokkaido, Honshu, Shikoku, Kyushu, Tsushima, Yakushima))
- Marumba gaschkewitschii carstanjeni (south-eastern Russian Far East, Khabarovsk Kray, Kamchatka; Primorskiy Kray, Korean Peninsula, north-eastern China, Heilongjiang, Jilin, Liaoning, Hebei, Beijing)
- Marumba gaschkewitschii irata (Nepal, through north-eastern India and southern Tibet to Yunnan and northern Vietnam)
- Marumba gaschkewitschii gressitti (Nantou Hsien, Puli, Hualien Hsien, Taroko National Park)
- Marumba gaschkewitschii discreta (Transbaikalia, Chita (Edinenie, Onon River), central and western Mongolia (Hovd Province), Övö-Hangaj Province (Hovd), Vostochnyy Aimak)
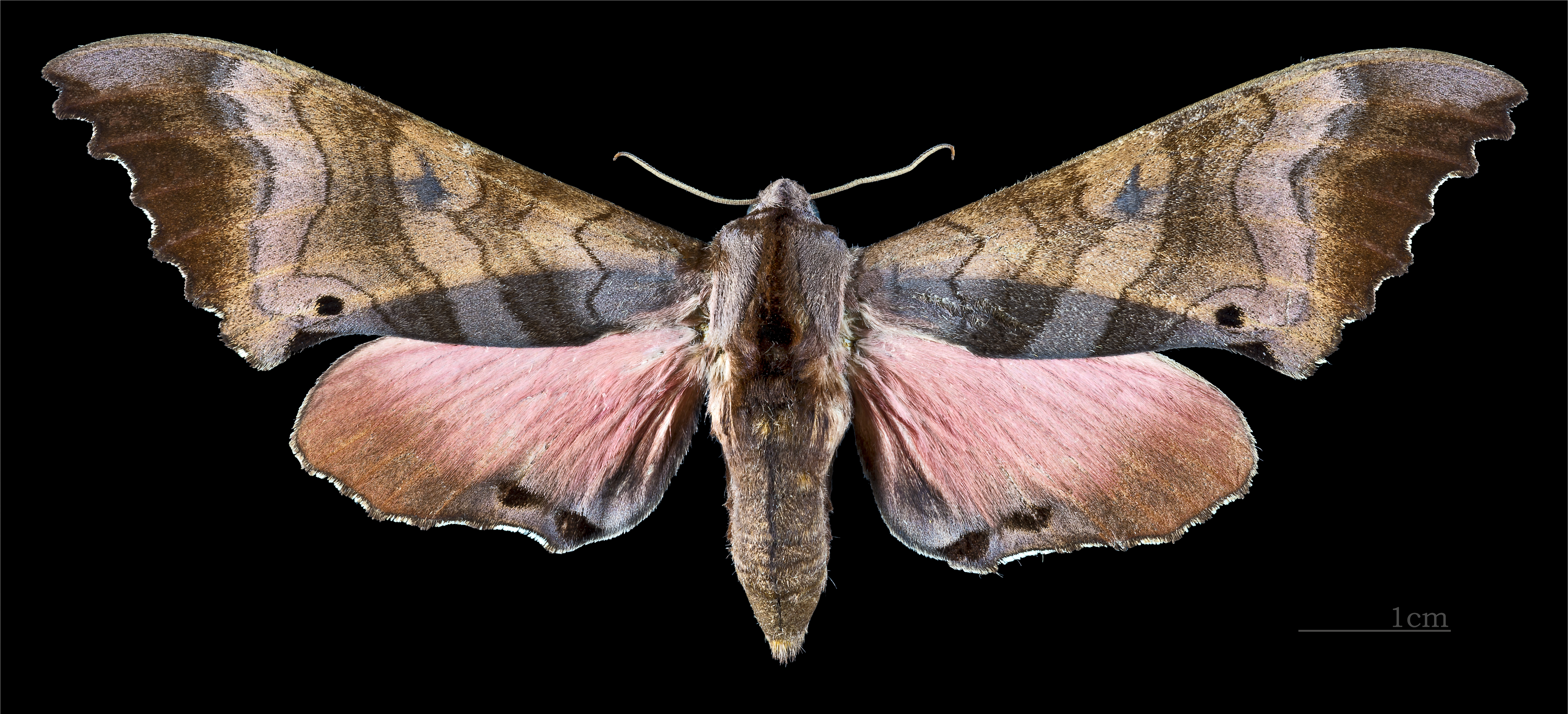
Female M. g. gressitti

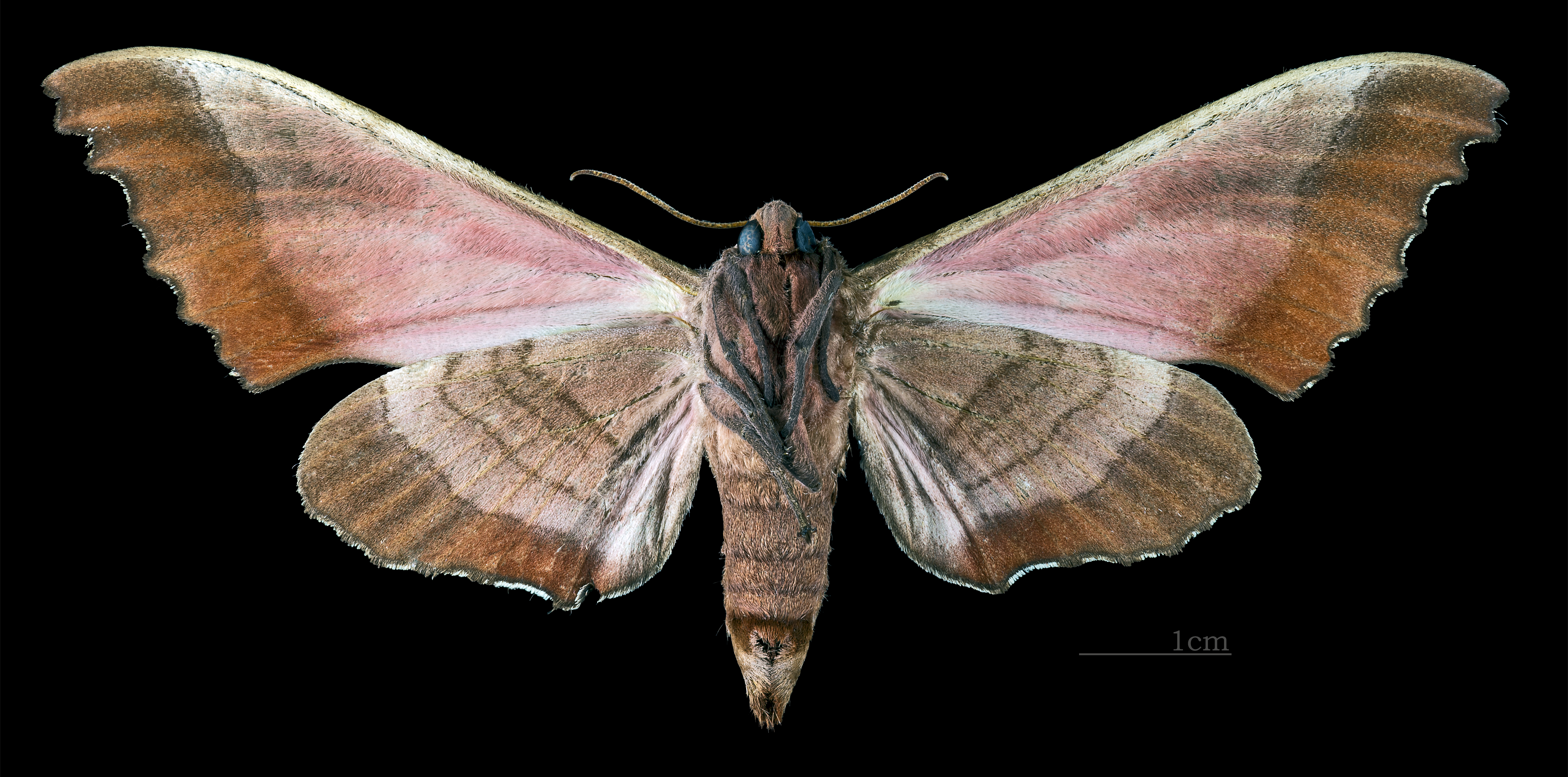
Female M. g. gressitti, underside

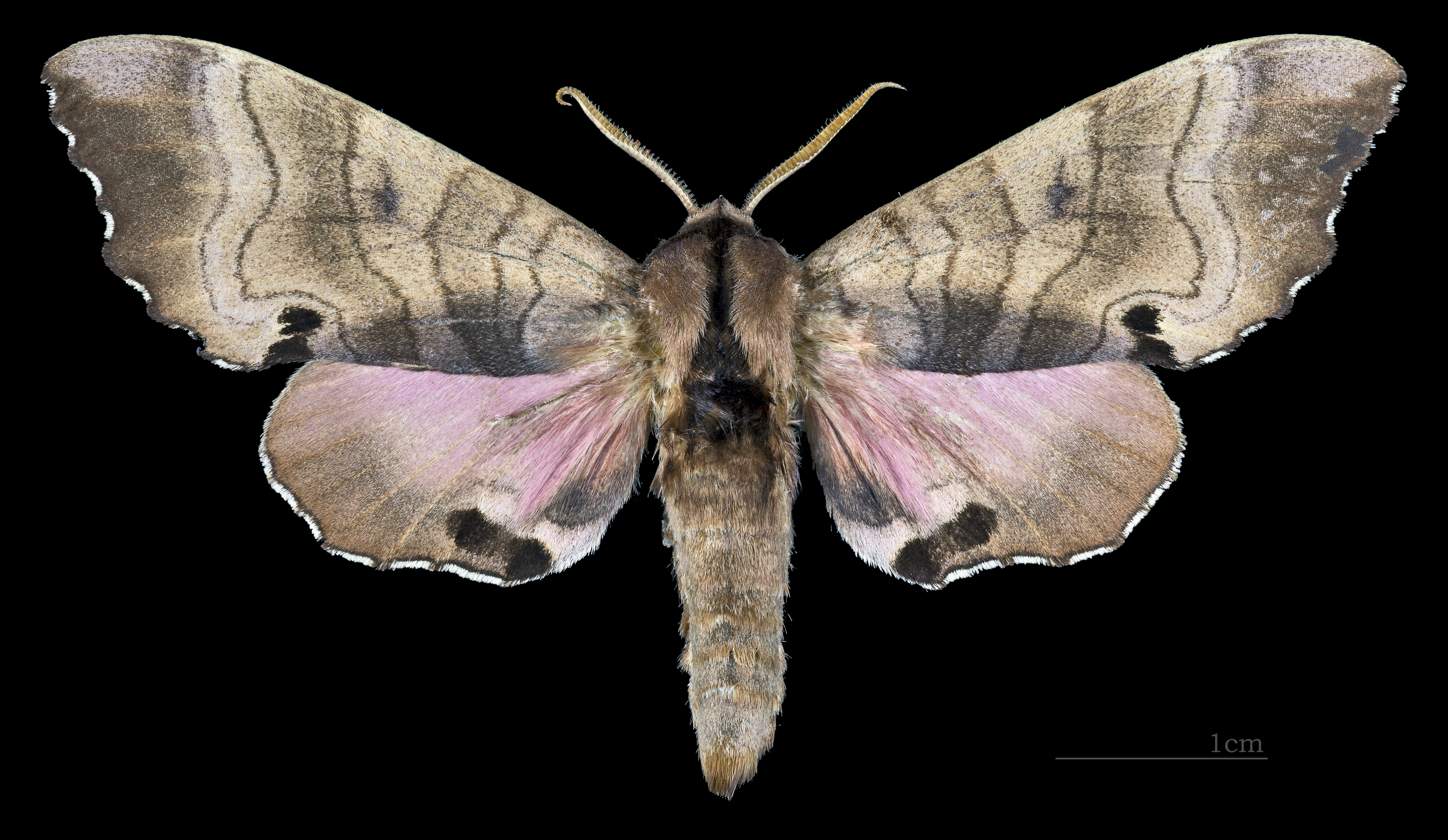
Male M. g. carstanjeni

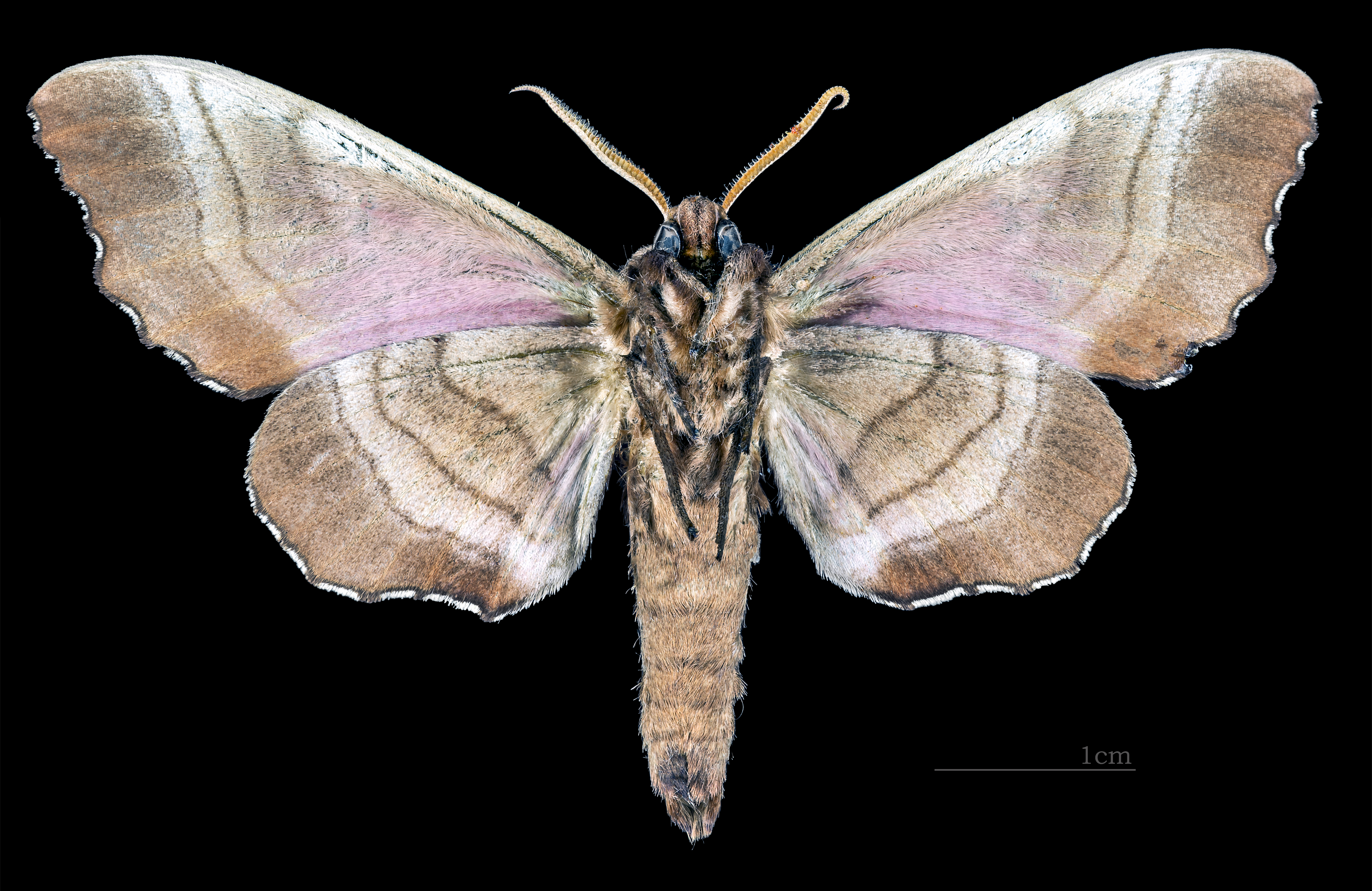
Male M. g. carstanjeni, underside
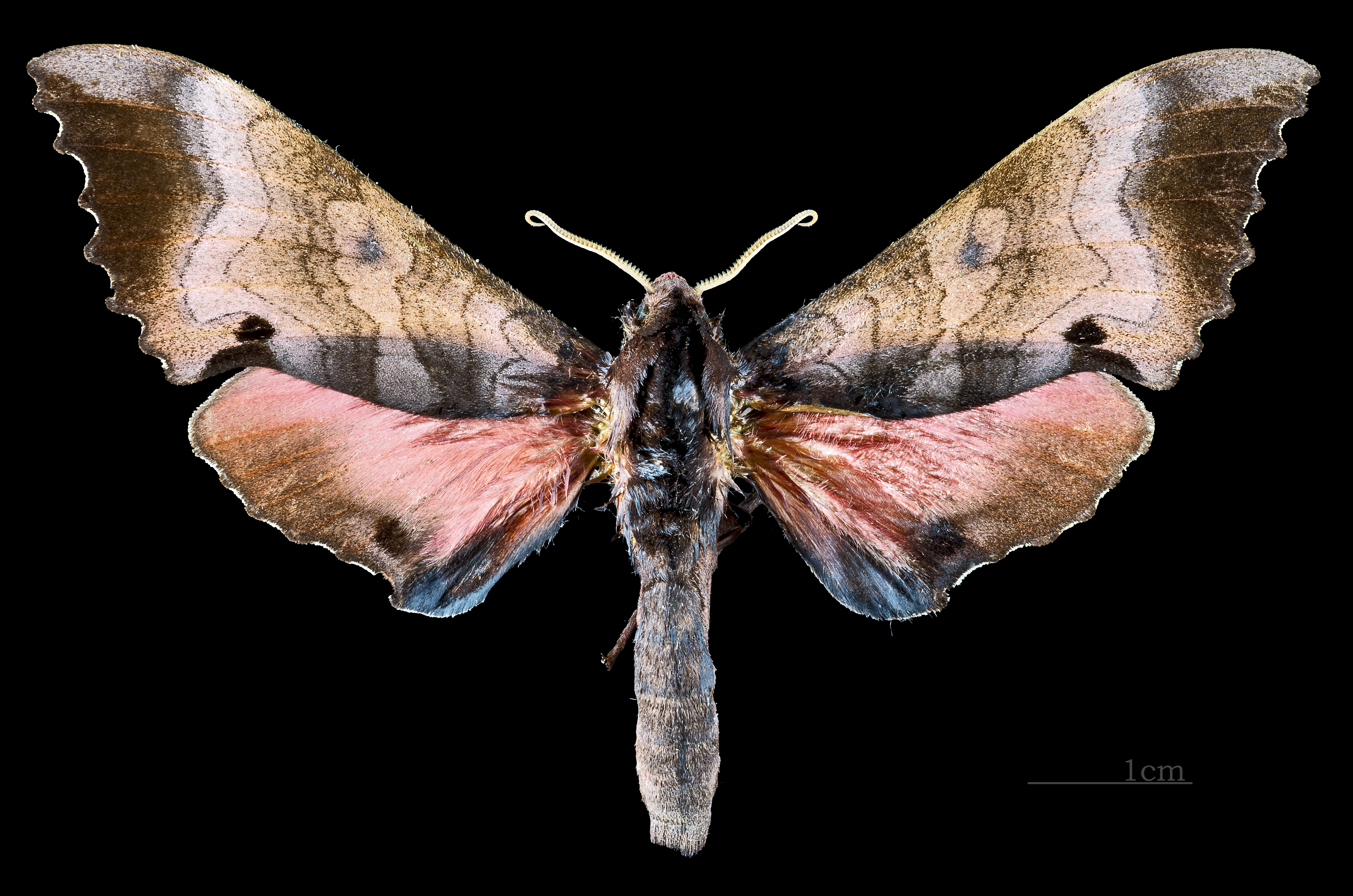
Male M. g. gressitti

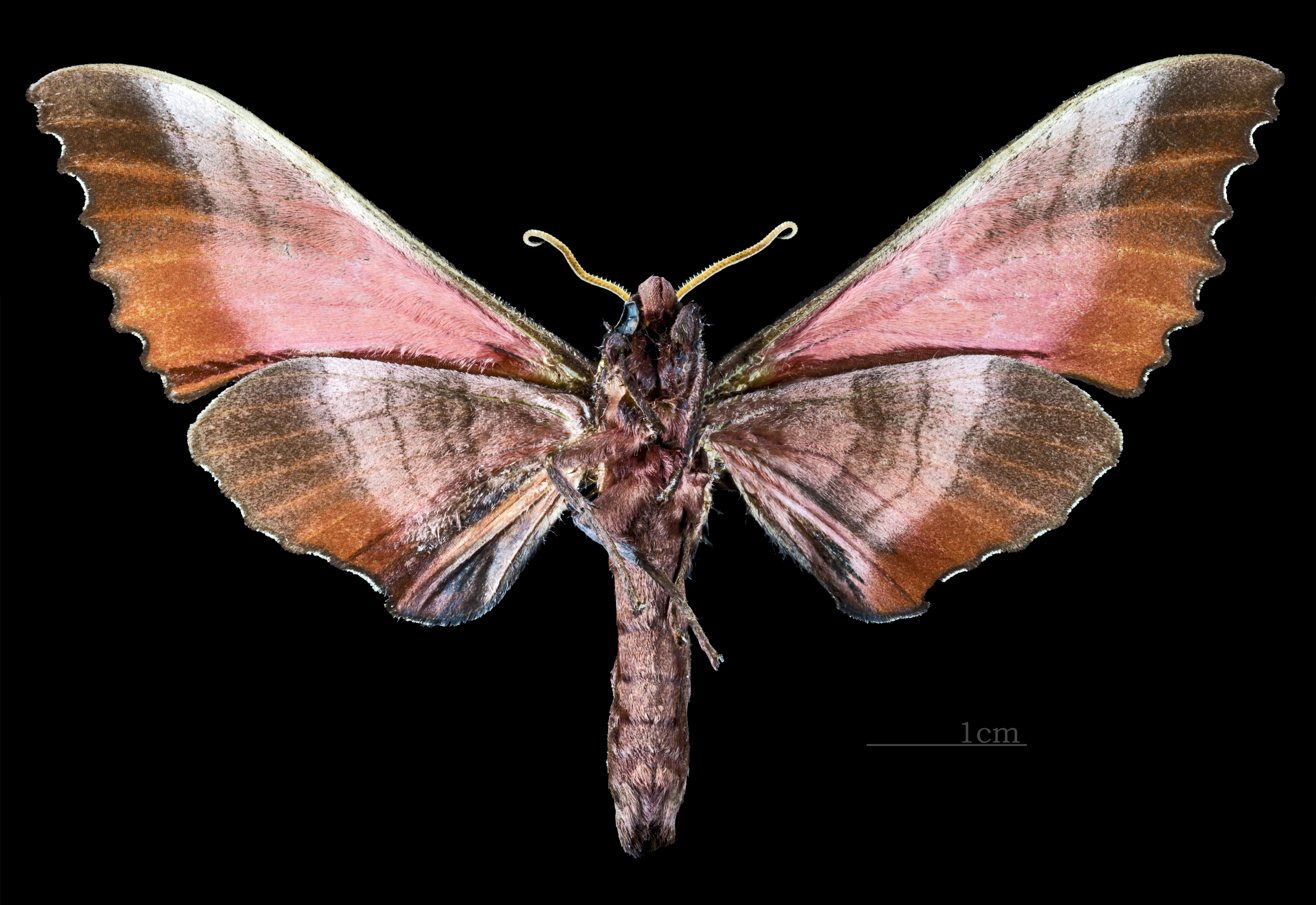
Male M. g. gressitti, underside
