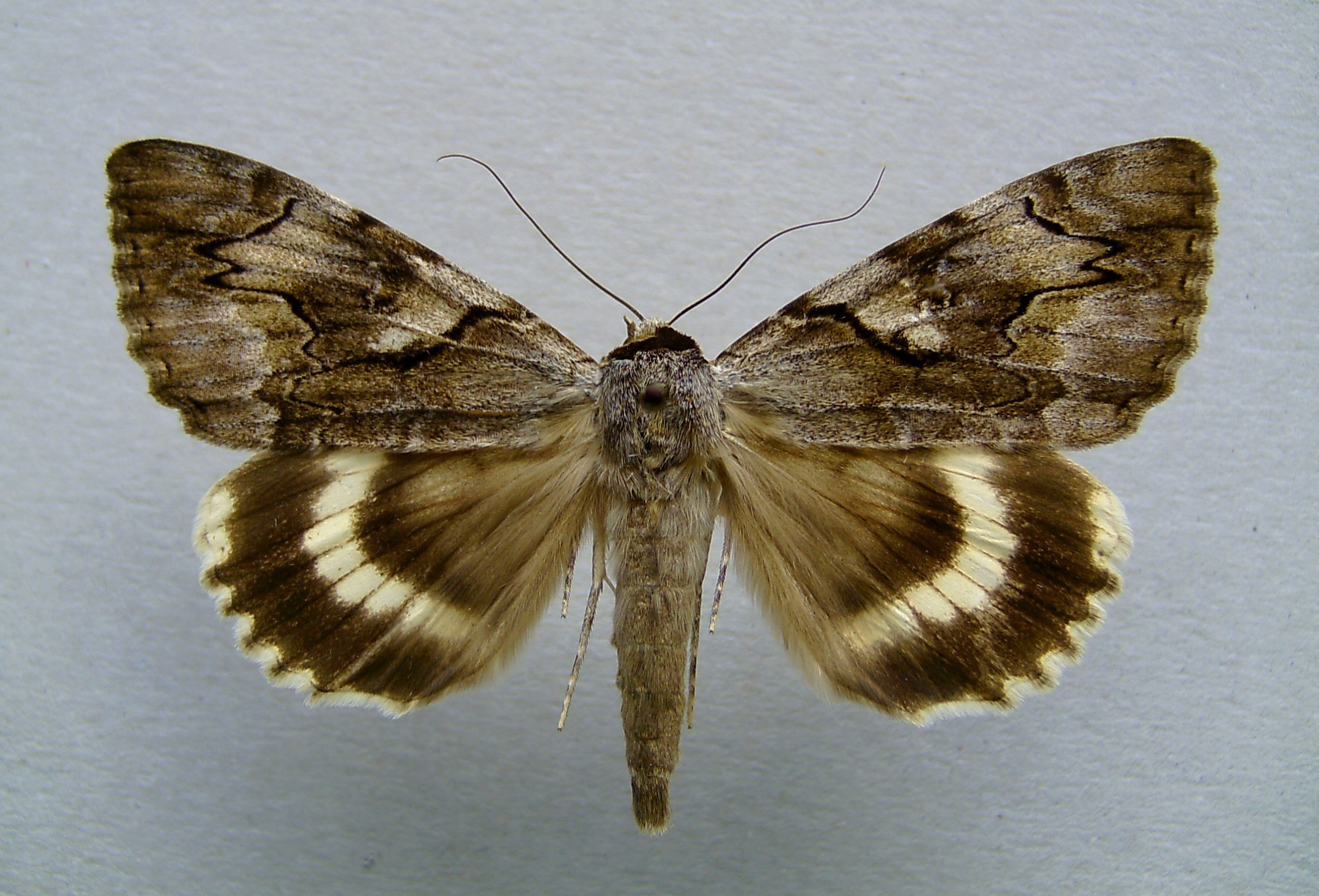

Scientific classification
- Kingdom: Animalia
- Phylum: Arthropoda
- Clade: Pancrustacea
- Class: Insecta
- Order: Lepidoptera
- Superfamily: Noctuoidea
- Family: Erebidae
- Genus: Catocala
- Species: C. lara

Binomial name
- Catocala lara Bremer, 1861

Synonyms
- Catocala pallidamajor Mell, 1939

= Catocala lara =

Species of moth

Catocala lara is a moth of the family Erebidae first described by Otto Vasilievich Bremer in 1861. It is found in Russia, Japan and Shanxi, China.
