= Catocala dissimilis =

Scientific classification
- Domain: Eukaryota
- Kingdom: Animalia
- Phylum: Arthropoda
- Class: Insecta
- Order: Lepidoptera
- Superfamily: Noctuoidea
- Family: Erebidae
- Genus: Catocala
- Species: C. dissimilis

Binomial name
- Catocala dissimilis Bremer, 1861

Synonyms
- Ephesia nigricans Mell, 1939 (nec Mell, 1939); Catocala nigricans; Ephesia griseata Bryk, 1949; Catocala hawkinsi Ishizuka, 2001; Ephesia fulminea chekiangensis Mell, 1933

Species of moth

Catocala dissimilis is a moth of the family Erebidae. It is found in Russia (Primorye, Shabarovsk, Southern Amur), China, Korea and Japan (Hokkaido, Honshu, Shikoku, Kyushu).

The wingspan is about 45 mm.

== Subspecies ==
- Catocala dissimilis dissimilis
- Catocala dissimilis melli Ishizuka, 2001
