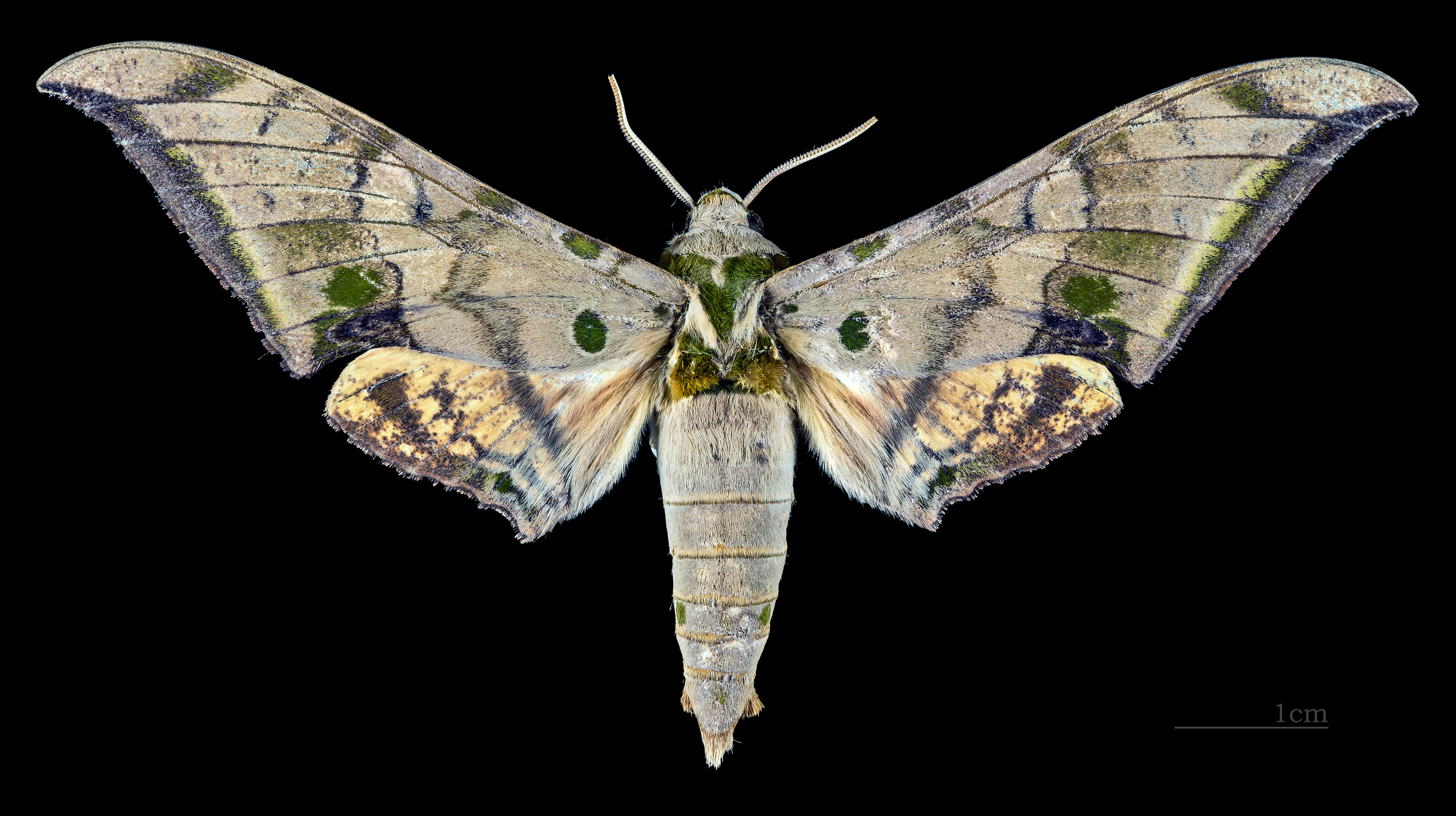
- Male, dorsal view
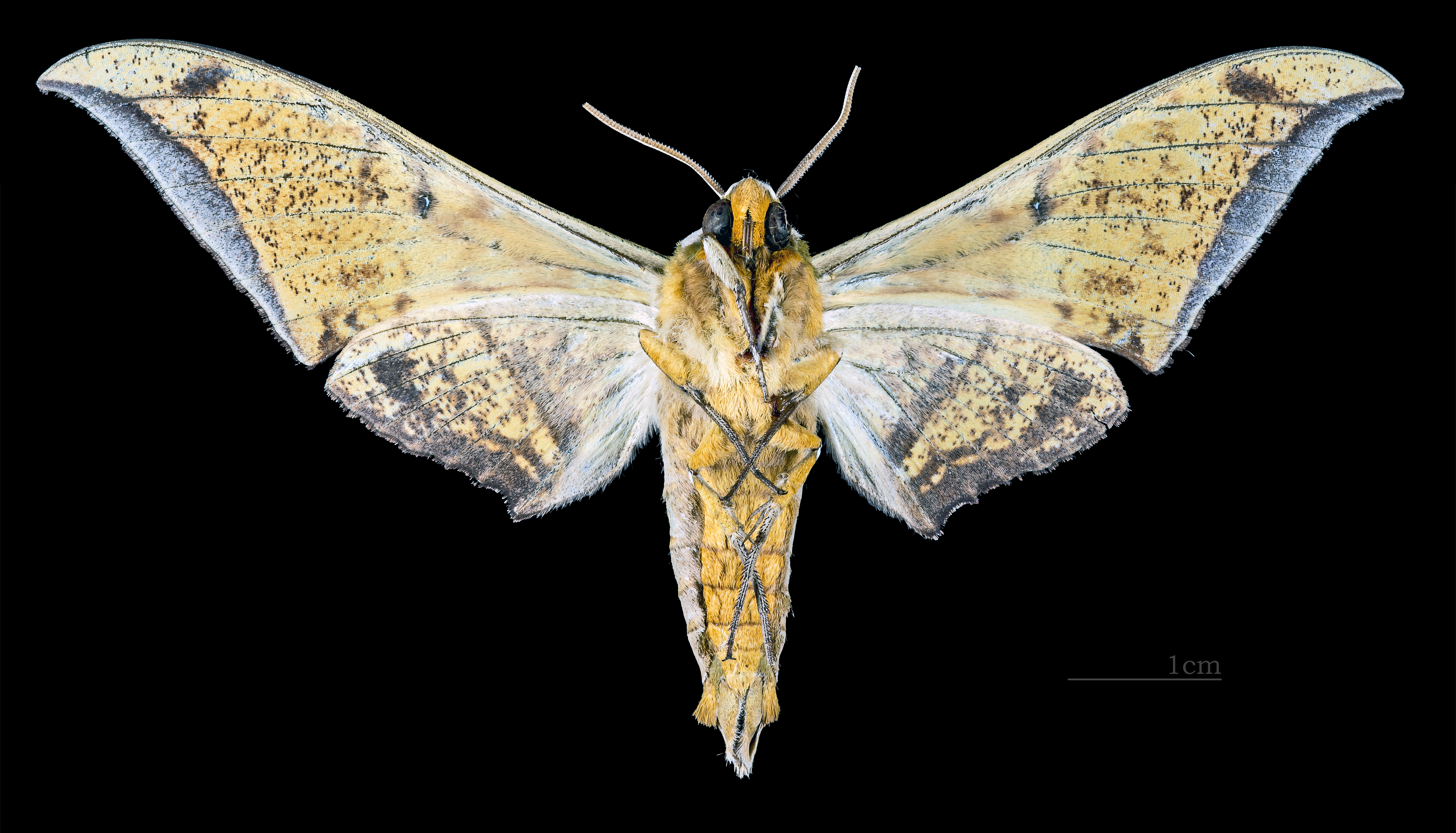
- Male, ventral view

Scientific classification
- Kingdom: Animalia
- Phylum: Arthropoda
- Class: Insecta
- Order: Lepidoptera
- Family: Sphingidae
- Genus: Ambulyx
- Species: A. schauffelbergeri

Binomial name
- Ambulyx schauffelbergeri Bremer & Grey, 1853

= Ambulyx schauffelbergeri =

Species of moth

Ambulyx schauffelbergeri is a species of moth of the family Sphingidae first described by Otto Vasilievich Bremer and William Grey in 1853.

== Description ==
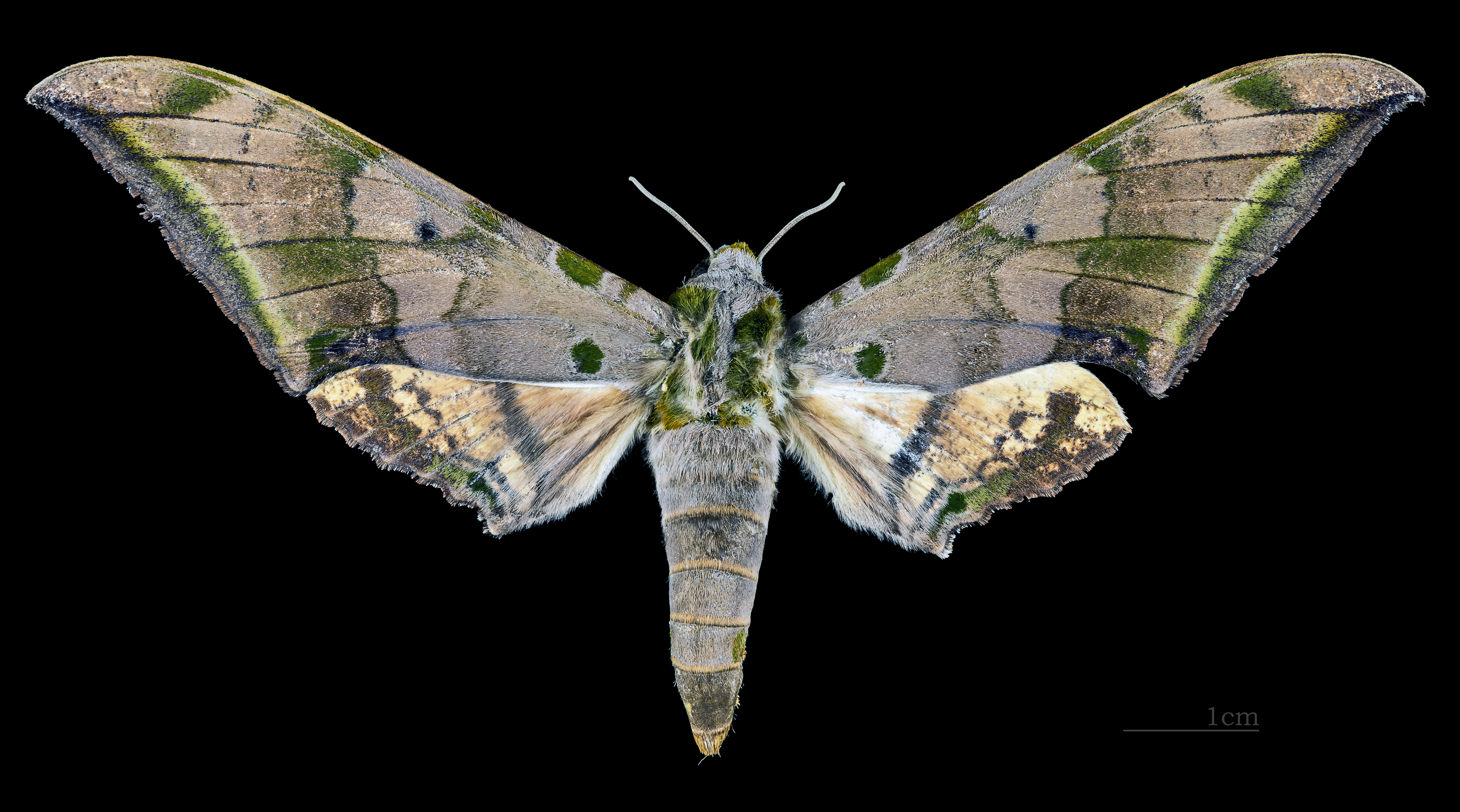
Female, dorsal view

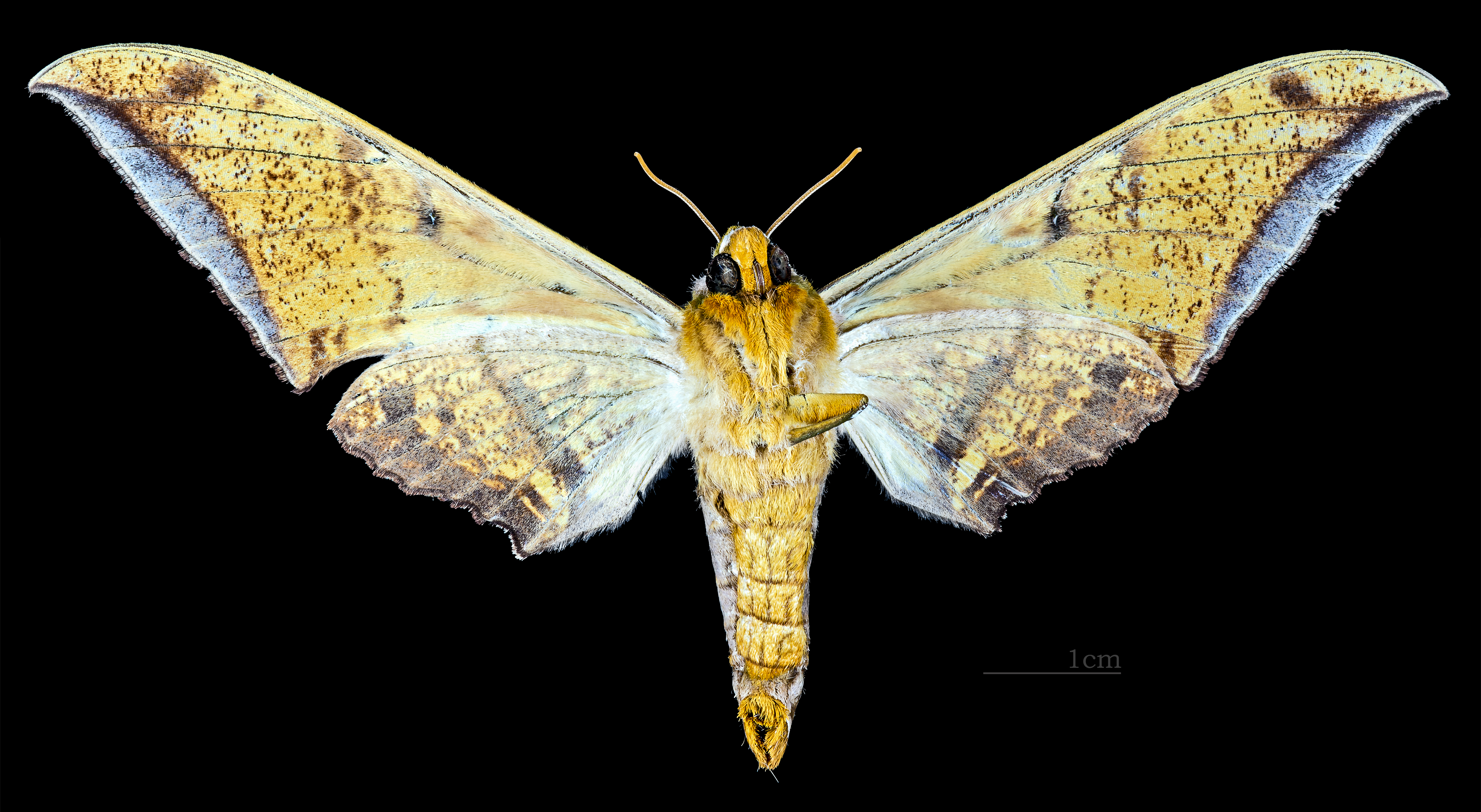
Female, ventral view
