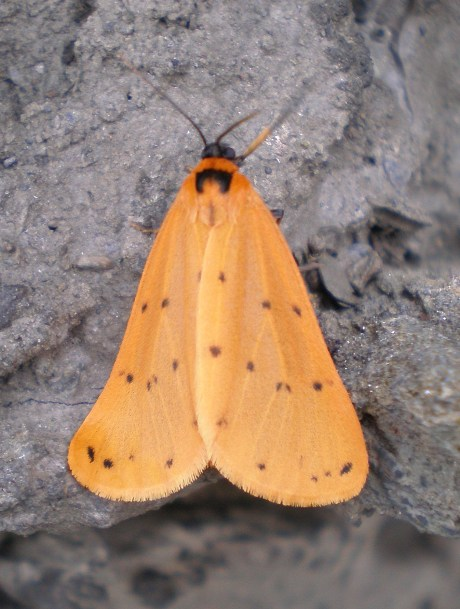

Scientific classification
- Domain: Eukaryota
- Kingdom: Animalia
- Phylum: Arthropoda
- Class: Insecta
- Order: Lepidoptera
- Superfamily: Noctuoidea
- Family: Erebidae
- Subfamily: Arctiinae
- Genus: Setina
- Species: S. flavicans

Binomial name
- Setina flavicans (Geyer, 1836)

Synonyms
- Bombyx flavicans Geyer, 1836; Setina irrorella var. flavicans

= Setina flavicans =

Species of moth

Setina flavicans is a moth of the family Erebidae. It is found in France and on the Iberian Peninsula.

The wingspan is 28–31 mm for males and 20–25 mm for females.

The larvae feed on various lichen species.

== Subspecies ==
- Setina flavicans flavicans
- Setina flavicans pseudoirrorela de Freina & Witt, 1985 (northern part of the Iberian Peninsula and the Pyrenees and its northern ranges)
