= Stigmatophora strigivenata =

Scientific classification
- Kingdom: Animalia
- Phylum: Arthropoda
- Class: Insecta
- Order: Lepidoptera
- Superfamily: Noctuoidea
- Family: Erebidae
- Subfamily: Arctiinae
- Genus: Stigmatophora
- Species: S. strigivenata

Binomial name
- Stigmatophora strigivenata (Hampson, 1894)

Synonyms
- Eugoa strigivenata Hampson, 1894

Species of moth

Stigmatophora strigivenata is a moth in the subfamily Arctiinae. It was described by George Hampson in 1894. It is found in Myanmar.
