= Setina cantabrica =

Scientific classification
- Kingdom: Animalia
- Phylum: Arthropoda
- Clade: Pancrustacea
- Class: Insecta
- Order: Lepidoptera
- Superfamily: Noctuoidea
- Family: Erebidae
- Subfamily: Arctiinae
- Genus: Setina
- Species: S. cantabrica

Binomial name
- Setina cantabrica de Freina & Witt, 1985

Species of moth

Setina cantabrica is a moth in the family Erebidae. It was described by Josef J. de Freina and Thomas Joseph Witt in 1985. It is found in Spain.
