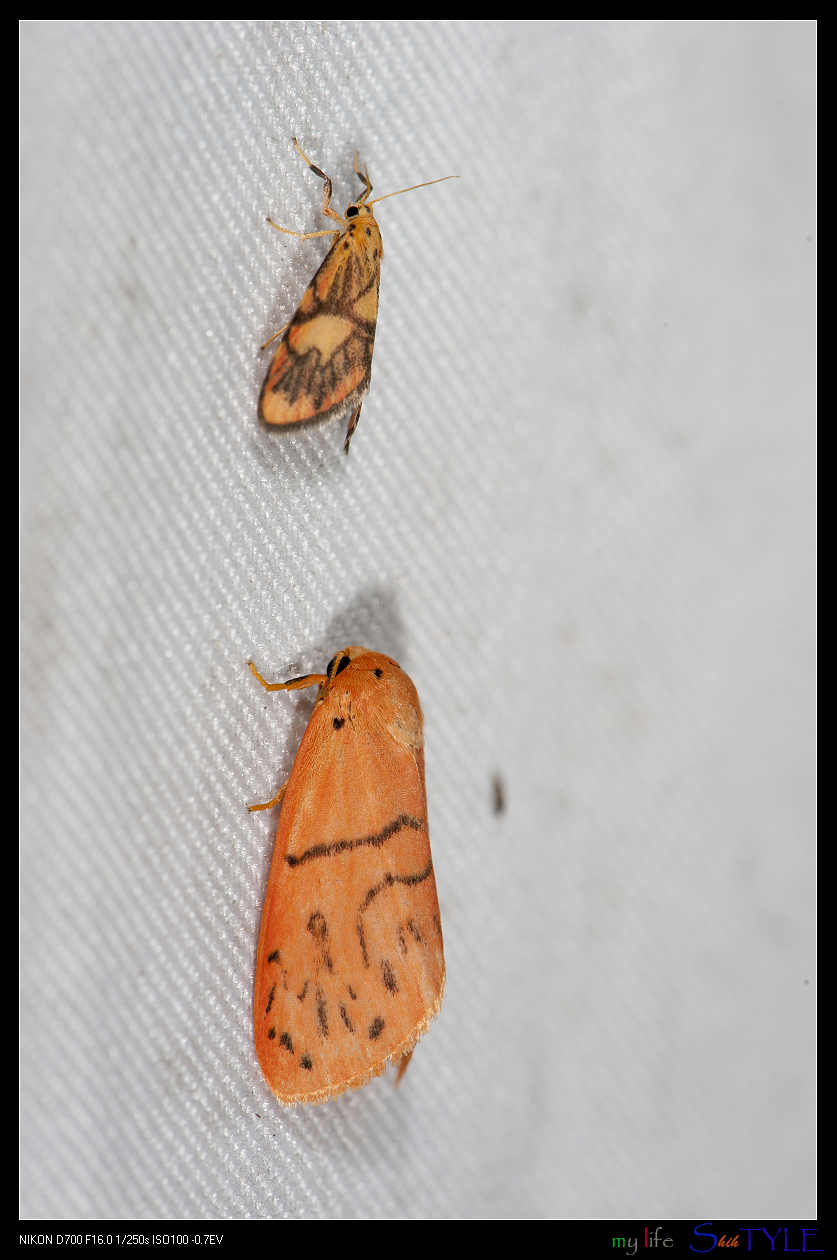
- Stigmatophora tridens

Scientific classification
- Kingdom: Animalia
- Phylum: Arthropoda
- Class: Insecta
- Order: Lepidoptera
- Superfamily: Noctuoidea
- Family: Erebidae
- Subfamily: Arctiinae
- Genus: Stigmatophora
- Species: S. tridens

Binomial name
- Stigmatophora tridens (Wileman, 1910)

Synonyms
- Miltochrista tridens Wileman, 1910

= Stigmatophora tridens =

Species of moth

Stigmatophora tridens is a moth in the subfamily Arctiinae. It was described by Wileman in 1910. It is found in Taiwan.
