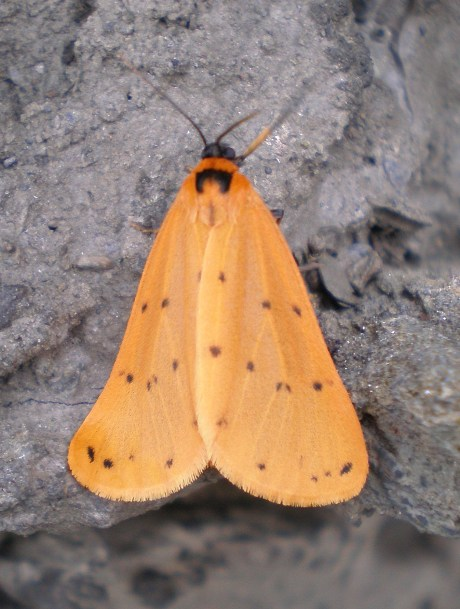
- Setina flavicans

Scientific classification
- Kingdom: Animalia
- Phylum: Arthropoda
- Class: Insecta
- Order: Lepidoptera
- Superfamily: Noctuoidea
- Family: Erebidae
- Subfamily: Arctiinae
- Subtribe: Endrosina
- Genus: Setina; Schrank, 1802

Synonyms
- Endrosa Hübner, [1819]; Philea Zetterstedt, [1839]

= Setina =

Genus of moths

Setina is a genus of moths in the family Erebidae.

== Species ==
- Setina alpestris Zeller, 1865
- Setina atroradiata Walker, 1864
- Setina aurata Menetries, 1832
- Setina aurita Esper, 1787
- Setina cantabrica de Freina & Witt, 1985
- Setina flavicans (Geyer, 1836)
- Setina irrorella Linnaeus, 1758
- Setina roscida (Denis & Schiffermüller, 1775)
