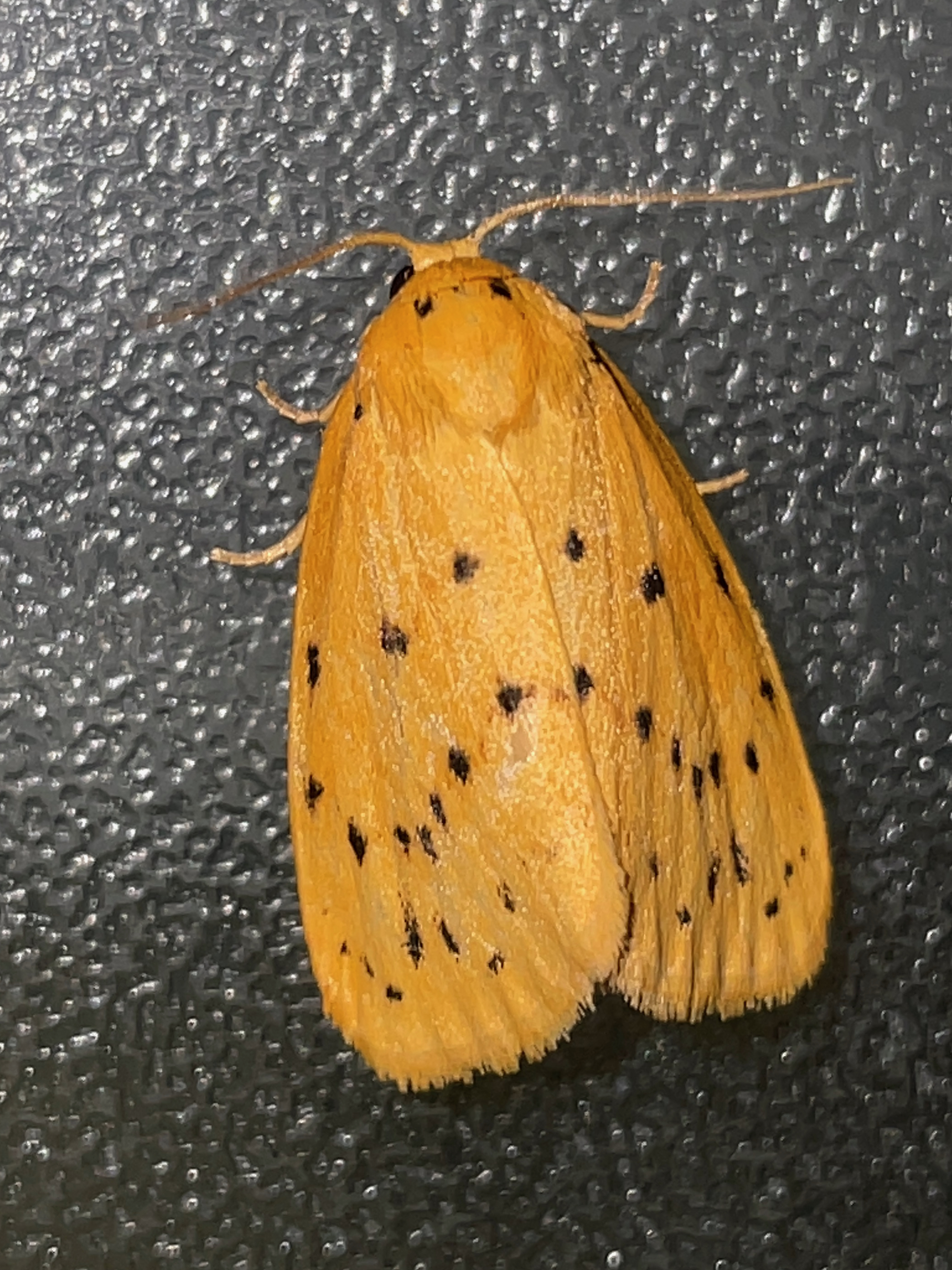

Scientific classification
- Kingdom: Animalia
- Phylum: Arthropoda
- Class: Insecta
- Order: Lepidoptera
- Superfamily: Noctuoidea
- Family: Erebidae
- Subfamily: Arctiinae
- Genus: Stigmatophora
- Species: S. leacrita

Binomial name
- Stigmatophora leacrita (Swinhoe, 1894)

Synonyms
- Setina leacrita Swinhoe, 1894; Stigmatophora ussurica Viidalepp, 1971

= Stigmatophora leacrita =

Species of moth

Stigmatophora leacrita is a moth in the subfamily Arctiinae. It was described by Charles Swinhoe in 1894. It is found in the Russian Far East (Primorye), China, Korea and Japan.
