= Setina alpestris =

Scientific classification
- Domain: Eukaryota
- Kingdom: Animalia
- Phylum: Arthropoda
- Class: Insecta
- Order: Lepidoptera
- Superfamily: Noctuoidea
- Family: Erebidae
- Subfamily: Arctiinae
- Genus: Setina
- Species: S. alpestris

Binomial name
- Setina alpestris Zeller, 1865

Synonyms
- Philea irrorella pseudokuhlweini Vorbrodt, 1914; Philea flavicans wolfsbergeri Burmann, 1975

Species of moth

Setina alpestris is a moth in the family Erebidae. It was described by Philipp Christoph Zeller in 1865. It is found in the Alps of Switzerland and Italy.

The wingspan 24–31 mm.

== Subspecies ==
- Setina alpestris alpestris
- Setina alpestris pseudokuhlweini (Vorbrodt, 1914)
- Setina alpestris wolfsbergeri (Burmann, 1975)
