= Stigmatophora rubivena =

Scientific classification
- Kingdom: Animalia
- Phylum: Arthropoda
- Clade: Pancrustacea
- Class: Insecta
- Order: Lepidoptera
- Superfamily: Noctuoidea
- Family: Erebidae
- Subfamily: Arctiinae
- Genus: Stigmatophora
- Species: S. rubivena

Binomial name
- Stigmatophora rubivena C.-L. Fang, 1991

Species of moth

Stigmatophora rubivena is a moth in the subfamily Arctiinae. It was described by Cheng-Lai Fang in 1991. It is found in China.
