= Setina aurata =

Scientific classification
- Domain: Eukaryota
- Kingdom: Animalia
- Phylum: Arthropoda
- Class: Insecta
- Order: Lepidoptera
- Superfamily: Noctuoidea
- Family: Erebidae
- Subfamily: Arctiinae
- Genus: Setina
- Species: S. aurata

Binomial name
- Setina aurata (Ménétriès, 1832)

Synonyms
- Lithosia aurata Ménétriès, 1832; Philea irrorella pontica Strand, 1931

Species of moth

Setina aurata is a moth in the family Erebidae. It was described by Édouard Ménétries in 1832. It is found in Georgia (Adjara), Armenia, and north-eastern Turkey.
