= Setina atroradiata =

Scientific classification
- Kingdom: Animalia
- Phylum: Arthropoda
- Class: Insecta
- Order: Lepidoptera
- Superfamily: Noctuoidea
- Family: Erebidae
- Subfamily: Arctiinae
- Genus: Setina
- Species: S. atroradiata

Binomial name
- Setina atroradiata Walker, 1864

Synonyms
- Lithosia atroradiata

Species of moth

Setina atroradiata is a moth of the family Erebidae. It was described by Francis Walker in 1864. It is found in South Africa.
