= Stigmatophora rhodophila =

Scientific classification
- Kingdom: Animalia
- Phylum: Arthropoda
- Class: Insecta
- Order: Lepidoptera
- Superfamily: Noctuoidea
- Family: Erebidae
- Subfamily: Arctiinae
- Genus: Stigmatophora
- Species: S. rhodophila

Binomial name
- Stigmatophora rhodophila (Walker, 1864)

Synonyms
- Barsine rhodophila Walker, [1865]

Species of moth

Stigmatophora rhodophila is a moth in the subfamily Arctiinae. It was described by Francis Walker in 1864. It is found in the Russian Far East (Middle Amur, Primorye), China (Heilongjiang, Beijing, Shanxi, Shandong, Jiangsu, Zhejiang, Hunan, Guangxi, Sichuan, Shaanxi), Korea and Japan.
