= Stigmatophora likiangensis =

Scientific classification
- Kingdom: Animalia
- Phylum: Arthropoda
- Class: Insecta
- Order: Lepidoptera
- Superfamily: Noctuoidea
- Family: Erebidae
- Subfamily: Arctiinae
- Genus: Stigmatophora
- Species: S. likiangensis

Binomial name
- Stigmatophora likiangensis Daniel, 1951

Species of moth

Stigmatophora likiangensis is a moth in the subfamily Arctiinae. It was described by Franz Daniel in 1951. It is found in Yunnan, China.
