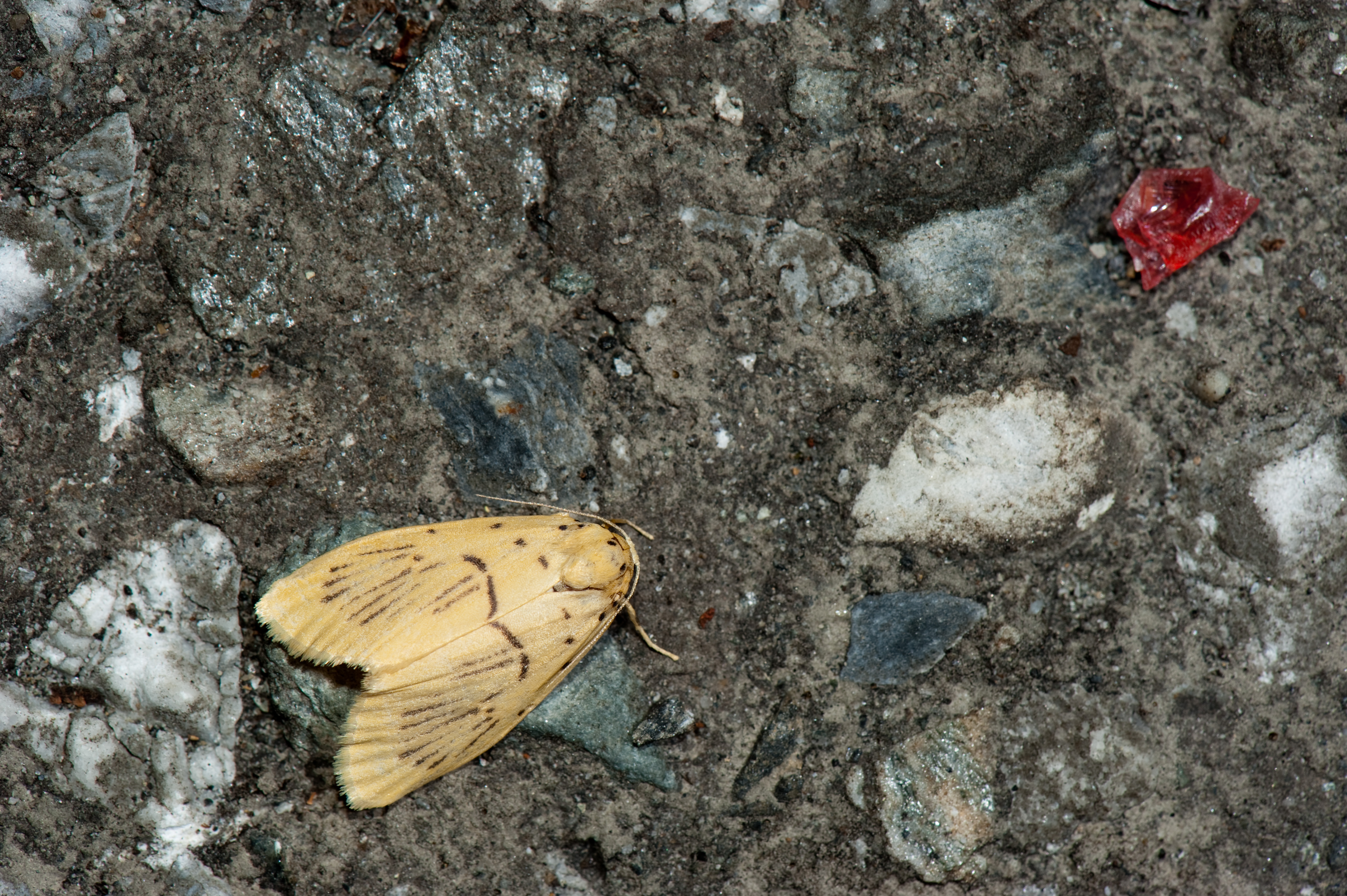

Scientific classification
- Kingdom: Animalia
- Phylum: Arthropoda
- Class: Insecta
- Order: Lepidoptera
- Superfamily: Noctuoidea
- Family: Erebidae
- Subfamily: Arctiinae
- Genus: Stigmatophora
- Species: S. palmata

Binomial name
- Stigmatophora palmata (Moore, 1878)

Synonyms
- Lyclene palmata Moore, 1878

= Stigmatophora palmata =

Species of moth

Stigmatophora palmata is a moth of the subfamily Arctiinae, first described by Frederic Moore in 1878. It is found in the north-western Himalayas and Assam.
