= Endrosina =

Scientific classification
- Domain: Eukaryota
- Kingdom: Animalia
- Phylum: Arthropoda
- Class: Insecta
- Order: Lepidoptera
- Superfamily: Noctuoidea
- Family: Erebidae
- Subfamily: Arctiinae
- Tribe: Lithosiini
- Subtribe: Endrosina

Subtribe of moths

The Endrosina are a subtribe of lichen moths in the family Erebidae.

== Taxonomy ==
The subtribe was previously classified as the tribe Endrosini of the subfamily Lithosiinae of the family Arctiidae.

== Genera ==
The following genera are included in the subtribe.

- Setina
- Stigmatophora
