= Stigmatophora grisea =

Scientific classification
- Kingdom: Animalia
- Phylum: Arthropoda
- Class: Insecta
- Order: Lepidoptera
- Superfamily: Noctuoidea
- Family: Erebidae
- Subfamily: Arctiinae
- Genus: Stigmatophora
- Species: S. grisea

Binomial name
- Stigmatophora grisea Hering, 1936

Species of moth

Stigmatophora grisea is a moth in the subfamily Arctiinae. It was described by Hering in 1936. It is found in China (Kansu).
