= Stigmatophora conjuncta =

Scientific classification
- Kingdom: Animalia
- Phylum: Arthropoda
- Clade: Pancrustacea
- Class: Insecta
- Order: Lepidoptera
- Superfamily: Noctuoidea
- Family: Erebidae
- Subfamily: Arctiinae
- Genus: Stigmatophora
- Species: S. conjuncta

Binomial name
- Stigmatophora conjuncta C.-L. Fang, 1991

Species of moth

Stigmatophora conjuncta is a moth in the subfamily Arctiinae. It was described by Cheng-Lai Fang in 1991. It is found in China.
