= Stigmatophora torrens =

Scientific classification
- Kingdom: Animalia
- Phylum: Arthropoda
- Class: Insecta
- Order: Lepidoptera
- Superfamily: Noctuoidea
- Family: Erebidae
- Subfamily: Arctiinae
- Genus: Stigmatophora
- Species: S. torrens

Binomial name
- Stigmatophora torrens (Butler, 1879)

Synonyms
- Miltochrista torrens Butler, 1879

Species of moth

Stigmatophora torrens is a moth in the subfamily Arctiinae. It was described by Arthur Gardiner Butler in 1879. It is found in Japan.
