= Stigmatophora =

Scientific classification
- Kingdom: Animalia
- Phylum: Arthropoda
- Class: Insecta
- Order: Lepidoptera
- Superfamily: Noctuoidea
- Family: Erebidae
- Subfamily: Arctiinae
- Subtribe: Endrosina
- Genus: Stigmatophora; Staudinger, 1881

Genus of moths

Stigmatophora is a genus of moths in the family Erebidae. The genus was described by Staudinger in 1881.

== Species ==
- Stigmatophora acerba Leech, 1899
- Stigmatophora bucseki Zhang, Zhao & Han, 2025
- Stigmatophora cernyi Volynkin, 2020
- Stigmatophora chekiangensis Daniel, 1951
- Stigmatophora confusa Daniel, 1951
- Stigmatophora conjuncta C.-L. Fang, 1991
- Stigmatophora danieli Volynkin, Huang & Dubatolov, 2021
- Stigmatophora dianensis Zhang, Zhao & Han, 2025
- Stigmatophora disticha Meyrick, 1894
- Stigmatophora flava Bremer & Grey, 1852
- Stigmatophora flavogrisea (Leech, 1899)
- Stigmatophora grisea Hering, 1936
- Stigmatophora hainanensis C.-L. Fang, 1991
- Stigmatophora inanis Seitz, 1913
- Stigmatophora leacrita (Swinhoe, 1894)
- Stigmatophora likiangensis Daniel, 1951
- Stigmatophora longa Staudinger, 1881 in Kaup in Zhang, Zhao & Han, 2025
- Stigmatophora micans Bremer & Grey, 1852
- Stigmatophora obraztsovi Daniel, 1951
- Stigmatophora orientalis (Daniel, 1951)
- Stigmatophora palmata Moore, 1878
- Stigmatophora rhodophila Walker, 1864
- Stigmatophora roseivena Hampson, 1894
- Stigmatophora rubivena C.-L. Fang, 1991
- Stigmatophora strigivenata Hampson, 1894
- Stigmatophora torrens Butler, 1879
- Stigmatophora tridens Wileman, 1910
- Stigmatophora zolotuhini Dubatolov & Bucsek, 2016
