= Stigmatophora acerba =

Scientific classification
- Kingdom: Animalia
- Phylum: Arthropoda
- Class: Insecta
- Order: Lepidoptera
- Superfamily: Noctuoidea
- Family: Erebidae
- Subfamily: Arctiinae
- Genus: Stigmatophora
- Species: S. acerba

Binomial name
- Stigmatophora acerba (Leech, 1899)

Synonyms
- Miltochrista acerba Leech, 1899

Species of moth

Stigmatophora acerba is a moth in the family Erebidae. It was described by John Henry Leech in 1899. It is found in western China.
