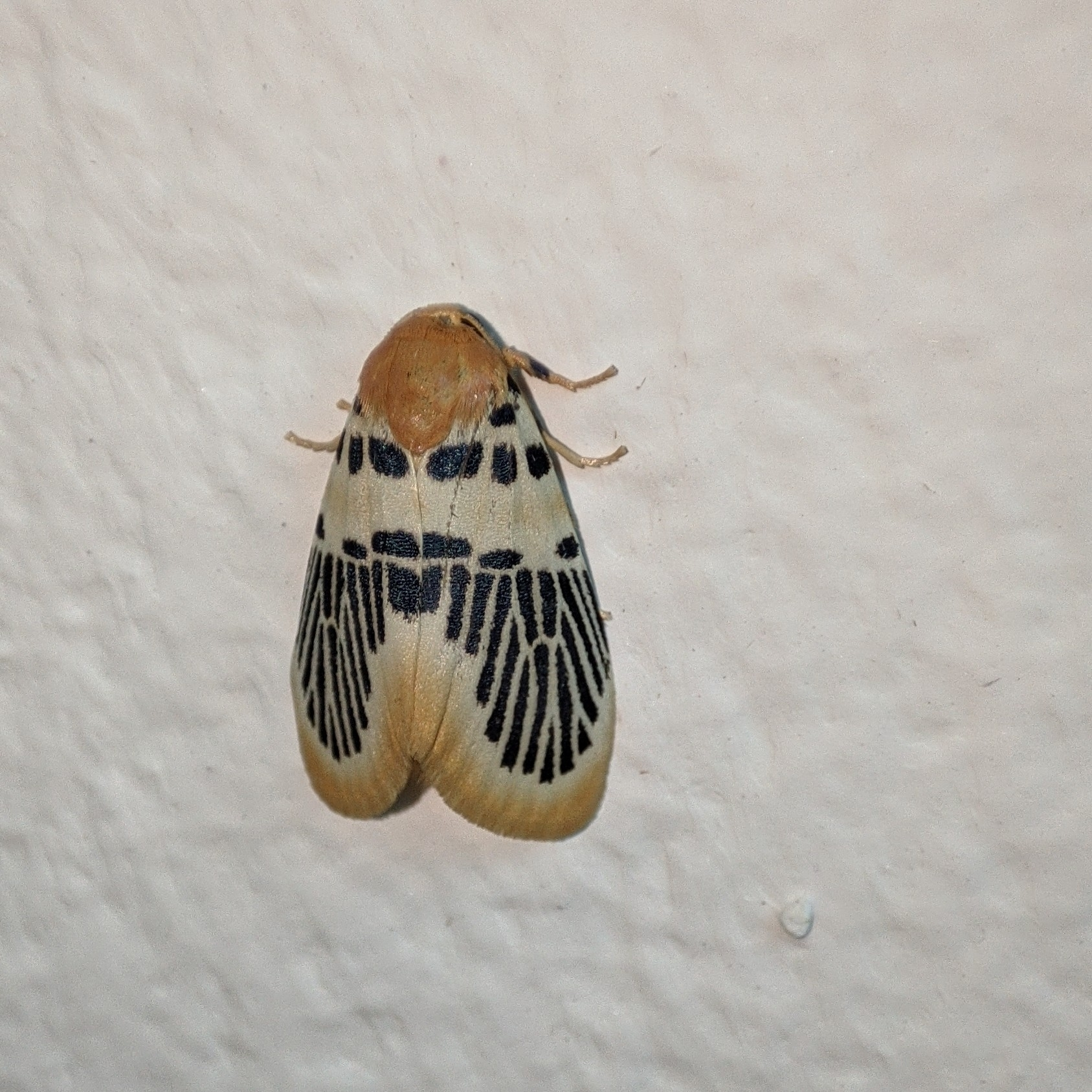

Scientific classification
- Kingdom: Animalia
- Phylum: Arthropoda
- Clade: Pancrustacea
- Class: Insecta
- Order: Lepidoptera
- Superfamily: Noctuoidea
- Family: Erebidae
- Subfamily: Arctiinae
- Genus: Stigmatophora
- Species: S. hainanensis

Binomial name
- Stigmatophora hainanensis C.-L. Fang, 1991

= Stigmatophora hainanensis =

Species of moth

Stigmatophora hainanensis is a moth in the subfamily Arctiinae. It was described by Cheng-Lai Fang in 1991. It is found in China.
