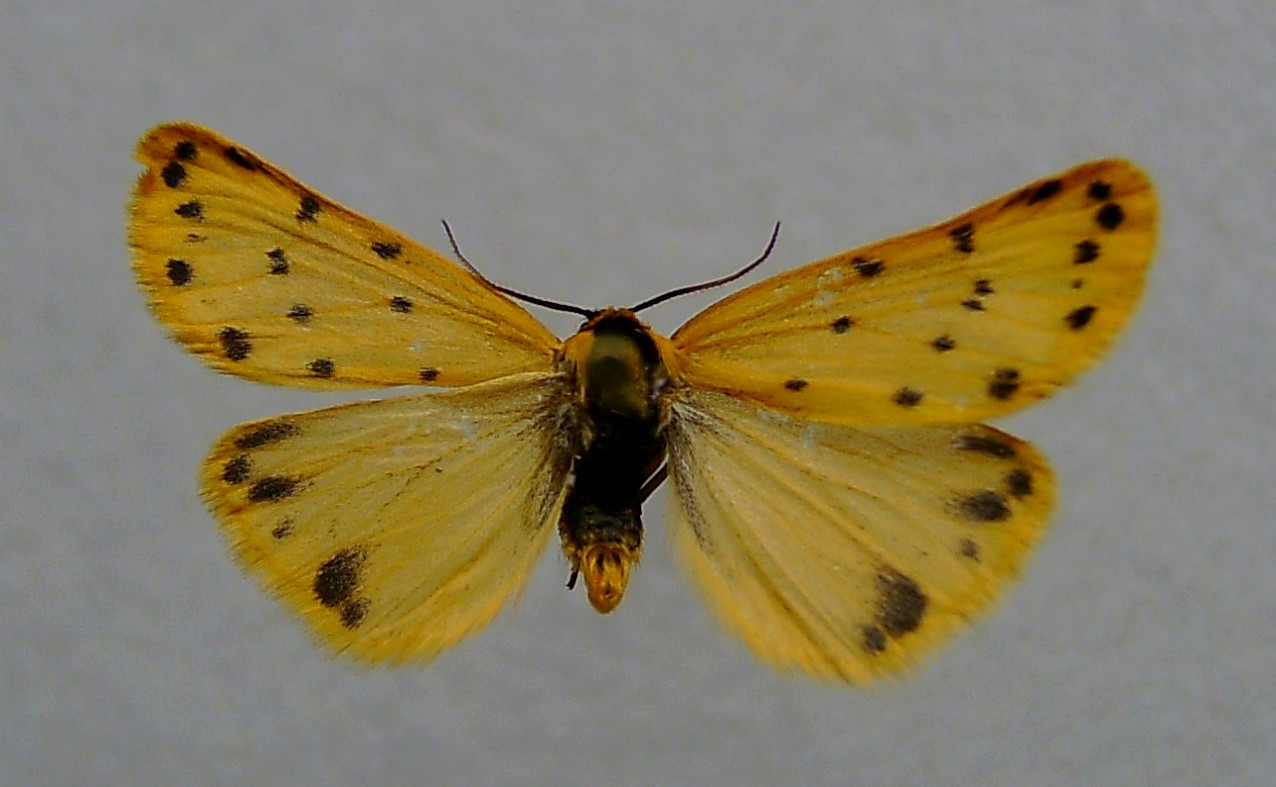

Scientific classification
- Domain: Eukaryota
- Kingdom: Animalia
- Phylum: Arthropoda
- Class: Insecta
- Order: Lepidoptera
- Superfamily: Noctuoidea
- Family: Erebidae
- Subfamily: Arctiinae
- Genus: Setina
- Species: S. roscida

Binomial name
- Setina roscida (Denis & Schiffermüller, 1775)

Synonyms
- Noctua roscida Denis & Schiffermüller, 1775; Tinea roscidella Fabricius, 1794; Lithosia melanomos Nickerl, 1845; Endrosa roscida var. bosniaca Rebel, 1910; Endrosa roscida var. baltica Wahlgren, 1913; Endrosa roscida f. brunnea Vorbrodt, 1921; Endrosa kuhlweini subalpina Thomann, 1951; Endrosa rubeni Viidalepp, 1979; Bombyx kuhlweini Hübner, [1824] 1796

= Setina roscida =

Species of moth

Setina roscida is a moth of the family Erebidae first described by Michael Denis and Ignaz Schiffermüller in 1775. It is found from western France through central Europe to the Volga area and the Altai.

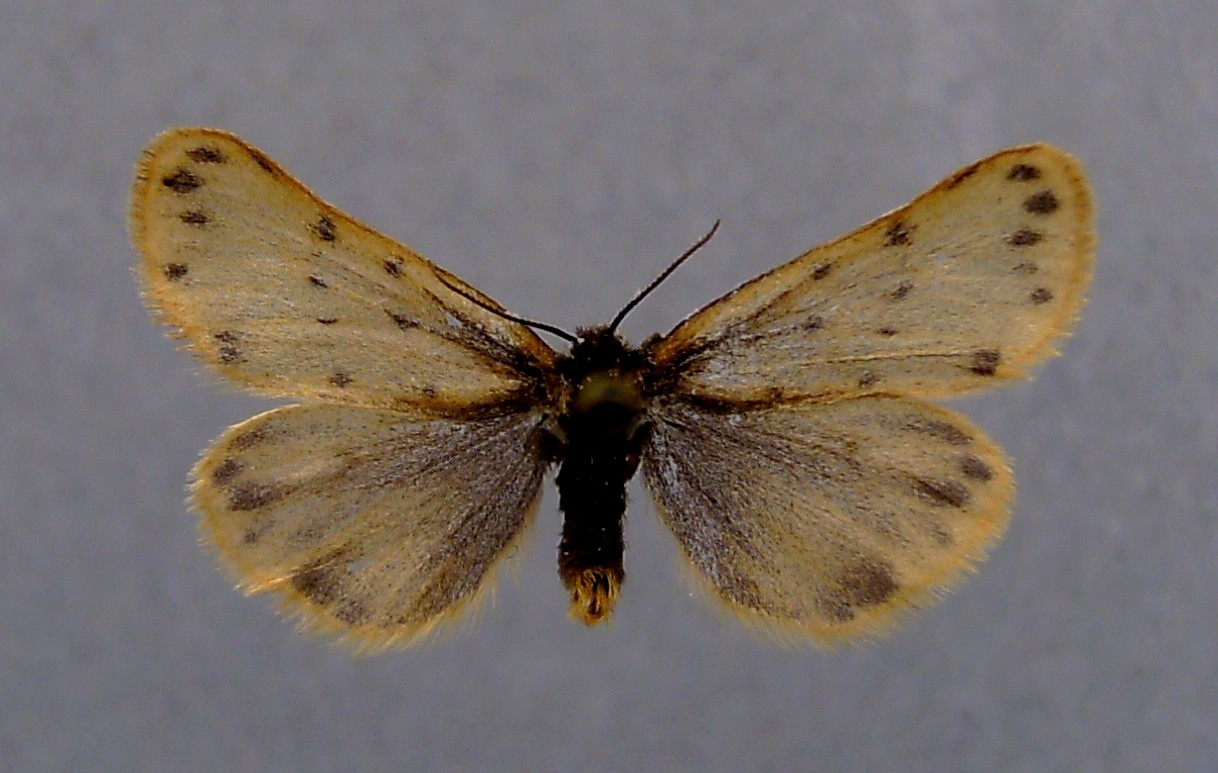
The darker form from the Alps

The wingspan is 19–24 mm for males and 14–20 mm for females. There are two generations per year with adults on wing from April to June and again from July to September.

The larvae feed on lichen. Larvae are found in late summer. The species overwinters in the larval stage. Pupation takes place in spring.

== Subspecies ==
- Setina roscida roscida
- Setina roscida kuhlweini (Hübner, [1823-1824])
