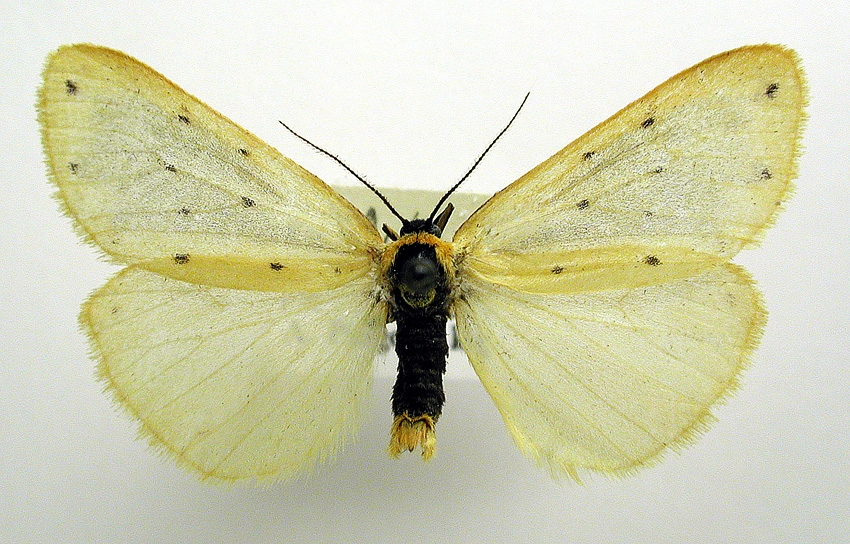

Scientific classification
- Kingdom: Animalia
- Phylum: Arthropoda
- Class: Insecta
- Order: Lepidoptera
- Superfamily: Noctuoidea
- Family: Erebidae
- Subfamily: Arctiinae
- Genus: Setina
- Species: S. irrorella

Binomial name
- Setina irrorella (Linnaeus, 1758)

Synonyms
- Phalaena Tinea irrorella Linnaeus, 1758; Phalæna ochracea Scopoli, 1772; Noctua irrorea [Denis & Schiffermüller], 1775; Phalaena flavanigropunctata Retzius, 1783; Phalaena Pyralis palealis de Villers, 1789; Phalaena Bombyx signata Borkhausen, 1790; Noctua irrorea Esper, 1786; Lithosia irrorata Fabricius, 1798; Lithosia binumerica Drapiez, 1819; Setina andereggi Herrich-Schäffer, 1847; Setina andereggi var. riffelensis Fallou, 1865; Endrosa irrorella var. nickerli Rebel, 1906; Philea irrorell f. brunnea Vorbrodt, 1914; Philea andereggi f. clara Daniel, 1953; Lithosia freyeri Nickerl, 1845; Setina irrorella lata Christoph, 1893; Philea irrorella mediterranea Daniel, 1964

= Setina irrorella =

Species of moth

Setina irrorella, the dew moth, is a moth of the family Erebidae. The species was first described by Carl Linnaeus in his 1758 10th edition of Systema Naturae. It is found in the Palearctic from Ireland and the Isle of Man, then through Europe and east to northern and central Asia to the Pacific Ocean (Siberia, Kamchatka, Chukotka northern Mongolia). It is missing in the high north and parts of the Mediterranean region. It is found also in the limestone Alps up to 2,000 meters above sea level.

== Technical description and variation ==
The wingspan is 27–33 mm. The length of the forewings is 11–18 mm. Light yellow, 3 transverse lines of minute black dots traverse the forewing, hindwing mostly with only one dot in the apex. Beneath, the forewing is glossy sooty grey with the exception of a rather irregular yellow outer margin. Among typical specimens there are found various aberrations, e.g. ab. signata Borkh., in which the middle rows of spots are united by streaks; ab. fumosa Sandb., with strongly brownish ground colour, described from the north, but also found in Germany. The species also varies strongly geographically: flavicans Bdv., from the Mediterranean and Anterior Asia, has brighter deep yellow wings and the apex of the abdomen yellow. — nickerli Rebel is paler yellow, the forewing slightly dulled with the exception of the clearer yellow inner margin; from the Alps and Northern Europe. This form is often found in collections as freyeri. — True freyeri Nick., is, however, according to Rebel, the much smaller insect from the highest Alps, in which the dots of the central rows sometimes merge. The black basal spot of the forewing mentioned by Rebel is unessential, and the pale yellow colour is found in nickerli as well as freyeri. — andereggi H.-Schiff. has the veins of the forewing dark, appearing like rays; from the high Alps, and in the higher North. — riffelensis Fall. is considerably smaller, the ground colour slightly dulled, the black vein-streaks more numerous, especially the costa and median veins strongly sooty black. In the high Alps, especially abundant above Zermatt;— lata Christ., larger, with broader wings, paler, with very few markings hindwing often quite without markings: from Russia over North Siberia to Kamtschatka. — insignata Stgr., quite similar to the preceding, but with narrower wings; forewing also with very few dots, and hindwing without any; East Siberia.

== Subspecies ==
- Setina irrorella irrorella
- Setina irrorella freyeri (Nickerl, 1845)
- Setina irrorella insignata Staudinger, 1881
- Setina irrorella mediterranea (Daniel, 1964)

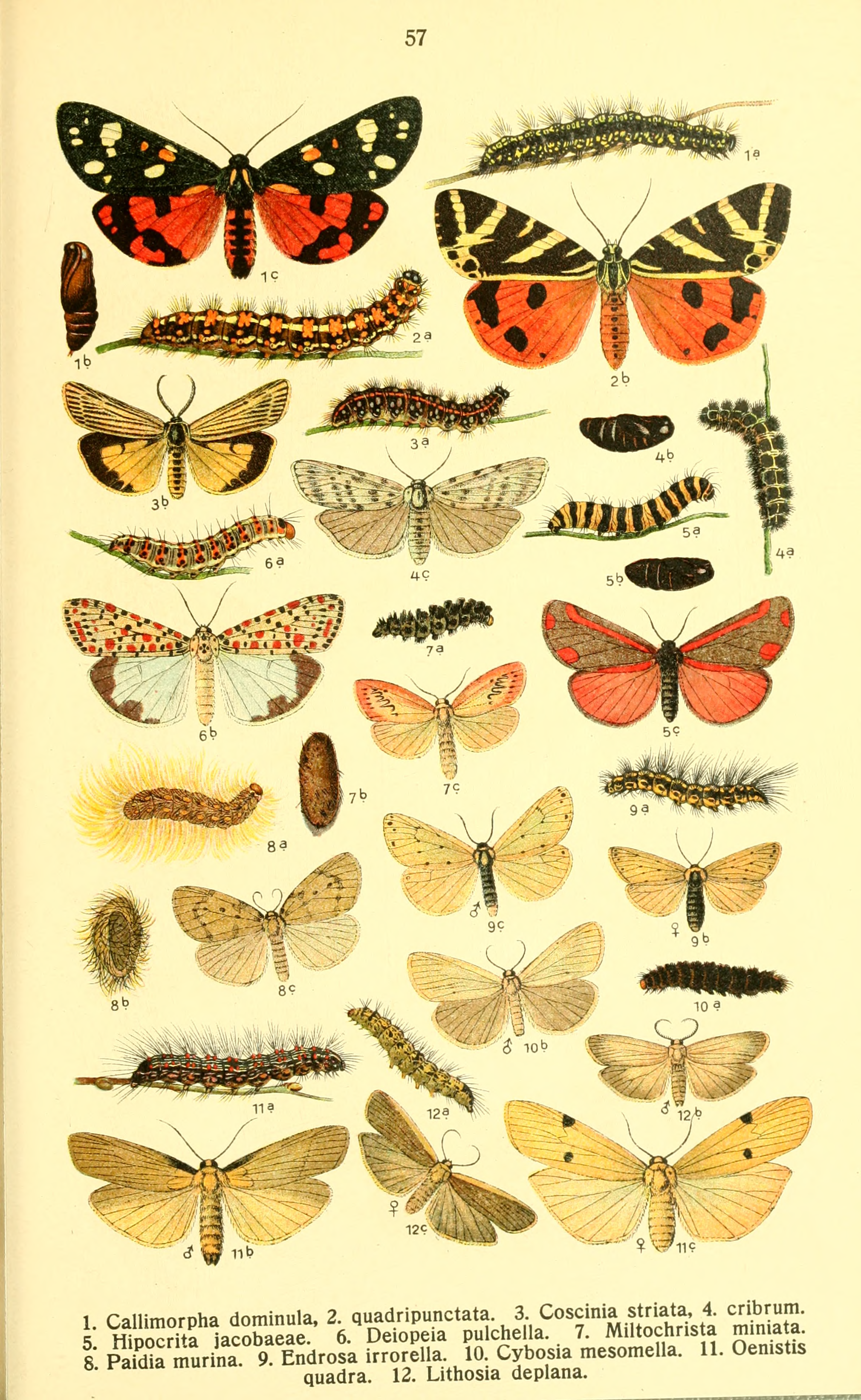
Male and female moth and larva (figures (9)

== Biology ==
The moth flies May to July depending on the location. It lives in mossy and lichen-covered rock corridors, on chalky and sandy areas and steep, rocky sparse grasslands, but also in bogs, forest meadows and on heaths

Larva black brown, reddish grey laterally, with black hairs intermixed with reddish-brown ones placed on small glossy black warts. Dorsally a row of bright yellow spots, often contiguous, subdorsally dull yellow ones, and yellow spots laterally.

The larvae feed on lichen until June. Pupa blackish brown. Moth in grassy spots, resting closely pressed to a stalk or branch, with the wings strongly slanting in roof shape. When disturbed they either drop down into the grass, or only fly a few yards. Common in suitable localities wherever they occur; the females must be searched for more diligently, as they fly less, but they are not rare.
