= Otto Vasilievich Bremer =

Otto Vasilievich Bremer (died 11 November 1873) was a Russian naturalist and entomologist.

He wrote:

- Beiträge zur Schmetterlings-fauna des Nödrlichen China's (1853) with Vasilii Fomich Grey (William Grey).
- "Neue Lepidopteren aus Ost-Sibirien und dem Amur Lande, gesammelt von Radde und Maack, beschrieben von Otto Bremer" (1861) Bulletin de l'Académie impériale des sciences de St.-Pétersbourg, 3(7): 461-496
- "Lepidopteren Ost-Sibiriens, insbesondere der Amur-Landes, gesammelt von den Herren G.Radde, R.Maack und P.Wulfius" (1864) Mémoires de l'Académie impériale des sciences de St.-Pétersbourg, 7 ser., 8(1): 103 pages

He described many insects, including the large skipper butterfly. Bremer's collection is in the Zoological Museum of the Russian Academy of Science in Saint Petersburg where he lived.
