= Athrips rancidella =

Cotoneaster webworm

Scientific classification
- Domain: Eukaryota
- Kingdom: Animalia
- Phylum: Arthropoda
- Class: Insecta
- Order: Lepidoptera
- Family: Gelechiidae
- Genus: Athrips
- Species: A. rancidella

Binomial name
- Athrips rancidella (Herrich-Schaffer, 1854)

Synonyms
- Gelechia rancidella Herrich-Schaffer, 1854; Athrips triatomea Mühlig, 1864; Gelechia vepretella Zeller, 1871; Gelechia superfetella Peyerimhoff, 1877; Cremona cotoneastri Busck, 1934; Epithectis cerasivorella Kuznetsov, 1960

Species of moth

Athrips rancidella, the cotoneaster webworm, is a moth of the family Gelechiidae. It is found in most of Europe, except Ireland, the Netherlands, Fennoscandia and the Baltic region. It has also been recorded from Syria, Turkmenistan, Tajikistan and the United States (Oregon and California).

The wingspan is 11–12 mm. Adults have been recorded on wing in June.

The larvae feed on Cotoneaster horizontalis, Prunus spinosa and Crataegus species.

== Subspecies ==
- Athrips rancidella rancidella (central and southern Europe, Iran, Syria, Turkmenistan, North America)
- Athrips rancidella tadzhika Bidzilya, 2005 (Tajikistan)
