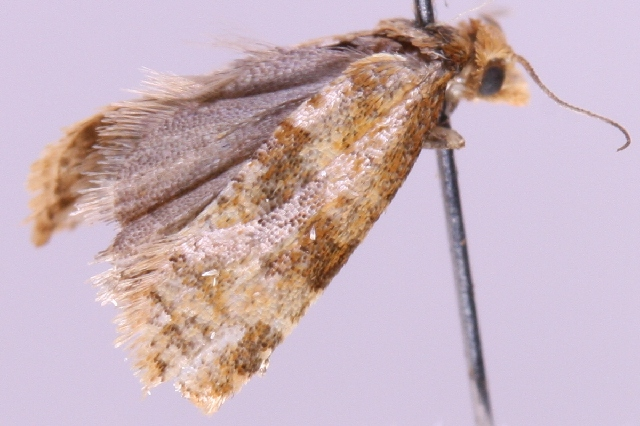
- Gynnidomorpha vectisana

Scientific classification
- Domain: Eukaryota
- Kingdom: Animalia
- Phylum: Arthropoda
- Class: Insecta
- Order: Lepidoptera
- Family: Tortricidae
- Tribe: Cochylini
- Genus: Gynnidomorpha; Turner, 1916

Synonyms
- Pierca Razowski, 1977; Piercea Filipjev, 1940

= Gynnidomorpha =

Genus of tortrix moths

Gynnidomorpha is a genus of moths belonging to the subfamily Tortricinae of the family Tortricidae.

== Species ==
- Gynnidomorpha alismana (Ragonot, 1883)
- Gynnidomorpha attenuata (Razowski, 1984)
- Gynnidomorpha curviphalla Y.H. Sun & H.H. Li, 2013
- Gynnidomorpha datetis (Diakonoff, 1984)
- Gynnidomorpha definita (Meyrick, 1928)
- Gynnidomorpha julianiensis (Liu & Ge, 1991)
- Gynnidomorpha luridana (Gregson, 1870)
- Gynnidomorpha mesotypa (Razowski, 1970)
- Gynnidomorpha mesoxutha Turner, 1916
- Gynnidomorpha minimana (Caradja, 1916)
- Gynnidomorpha permixtana ([Denis & Schiffermuller], 1775)
- Gynnidomorpha pista (Diakonoff, 1984)
- Gynnidomorpha romonana (Kearfott, 1908)
- Gynnidomorpha rubricana (Peyerimhoff, 1877)
- Gynnidomorpha sphaenophora (Diakonoff, 1941)
- Gynnidomorpha stirodelphys (Diakonoff, 1976)
- Gynnidomorpha vectisana (Humphreys & Westwood, 1845)

== See also ==
- List of Tortricidae genera
