= Acleris caucasica =

Scientific classification
- Domain: Eukaryota
- Kingdom: Animalia
- Phylum: Arthropoda
- Class: Insecta
- Order: Lepidoptera
- Family: Tortricidae
- Genus: Acleris
- Species: A. caucasica

Binomial name
- Acleris caucasica (Filipjev, 1962)

Synonyms
- Peronea caucasica Filipjev, 1962; Teras cyaneana Peyerimhoff, 1872; dissonana Herrich-Schaffer, 1849; Teras longulana Eversmann, 1844

Species of moth

Acleris caucasica is a species of moth of the family Tortricidae. It is found in the Alps of Europe, the eastern Baltic region, the northern parts of European Russia, Georgia, Primorsk and Amur Territory, northern China and Iran.

The wingspan is 12.5–15 mm.

== Taxonomy ==
The species is alternatively placed as a subspecies of Acleris lacordairana.
