= Gynnidomorpha romonana =

Scientific classification
- Domain: Eukaryota
- Kingdom: Animalia
- Phylum: Arthropoda
- Class: Insecta
- Order: Lepidoptera
- Family: Tortricidae
- Genus: Gynnidomorpha
- Species: G. romonana

Binomial name
- Gynnidomorpha romonana (Kearfott, 1908)

Synonyms
- Phalonia romonana Kearfott, 1908; Phalonia officiosa Meyrick, 1912

Species of moth

Gynnidomorpha romonana is a species of moth of the family Tortricidae. It is found in North America, where it has been recorded from Indiana, Manitoba, Maryland, New Jersey and Ontario.

The wingspan is 10–12 mm. Adults have been recorded on wing in May, July and September.
