= Eulamprotes libertinella =

Scientific classification
- Kingdom: Animalia
- Phylum: Arthropoda
- Clade: Pancrustacea
- Class: Insecta
- Order: Lepidoptera
- Family: Gelechiidae
- Genus: Eulamprotes
- Species: E. libertinella

Binomial name
- Eulamprotes libertinella (Zeller, 1872)

Synonyms
- Gelechia libertinella Zeller, 1872

Species of moth

Eulamprotes libertinella is a moth of the family Gelechiidae. It was described by Philipp Christoph Zeller in 1872. It is found in Spain, France, Switzerland, Austria, Italy, the Czech Republic and Bosnia and Herzegovina.

The wingspan is 10.5–11 mm.
