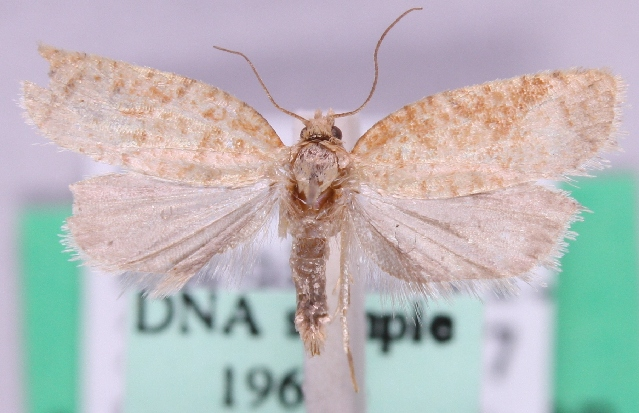

Scientific classification
- Domain: Eukaryota
- Kingdom: Animalia
- Phylum: Arthropoda
- Class: Insecta
- Order: Lepidoptera
- Family: Tortricidae
- Genus: Acleris
- Species: A. quercinana

Binomial name
- Acleris quercinana (Zeller, 1849)

Synonyms
- Teras quercinana Zeller, 1849; Acleris quercinana ab. disquei Obraztsov, 1957; Teras mucidana Peyerimhoff, 1873; Acleris querciana Obraztsov, 1957

= Acleris quercinana =

Species of moth

Acleris quercinana is a species of moth of the family Tortricidae. It was described by Zeller in 1849. It is found in most of Europe (except Ireland, Great Britain, Norway, Finland, the Baltic region, Croatia and Slovakia), Asia Minor and Iran.

The wingspan is 12–15 millimetres (0.47–0.59 in). Adults have been recorded on wing from June to August.

The larvae feed on Quercus species. Larvae can be found from May to June.
