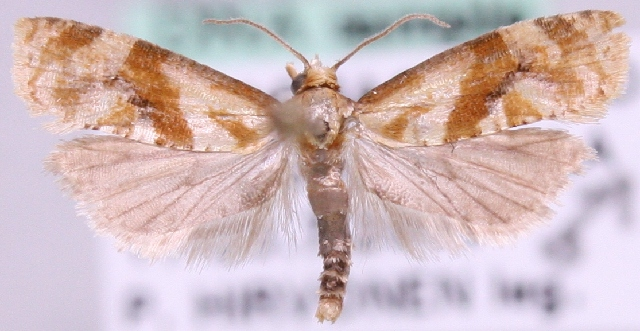

Scientific classification
- Domain: Eukaryota
- Kingdom: Animalia
- Phylum: Arthropoda
- Class: Insecta
- Order: Lepidoptera
- Family: Tortricidae
- Genus: Gynnidomorpha
- Species: G. permixtana

Binomial name
- Gynnidomorpha permixtana ([Denis & Schiffermüller], 1775)

Synonyms
- List: Tortrix permixtana [Denis & Schiffermüller], 1775; Phalonidia permixtana [Denis & Schiffermüller], 1775; Phalonia walsinghamana Pierce & Metcalf, 1922; Piercea walsinghamanaPierce & Metcalf, 1922; Cochylis dymotana Treitschke, 1835; Cochylis mussehliana Treitschke, 1835

= Gynnidomorpha permixtana =

Coast conch

Species of moth

Gynnidomorpha permixtana, the coast conch, is a moth of the family Tortricidae. The species was first described in 1775 by the Austrian lepidopterists, Michael Denis and Ignaz Schiffermüller. The moth is found in Asia and Europe.

== Distribution ==
It is found in China (Anhui, Beijing, Fujian, Gansu, Guizhou, Hainan, Hebei, Heilongjiang, Henan, Hubei, Liaoning, Ningxia, Shaanxi, Shandong, Shanghai, Shanxi, Sichuan, Tianjin, Xizang, Zhejiang), Afghanistan, Iran, Japan, Korea, Mongolia, Russia, Sri Lanka and Europe. The habitat consists of waste ground, damp heathland and mosses.

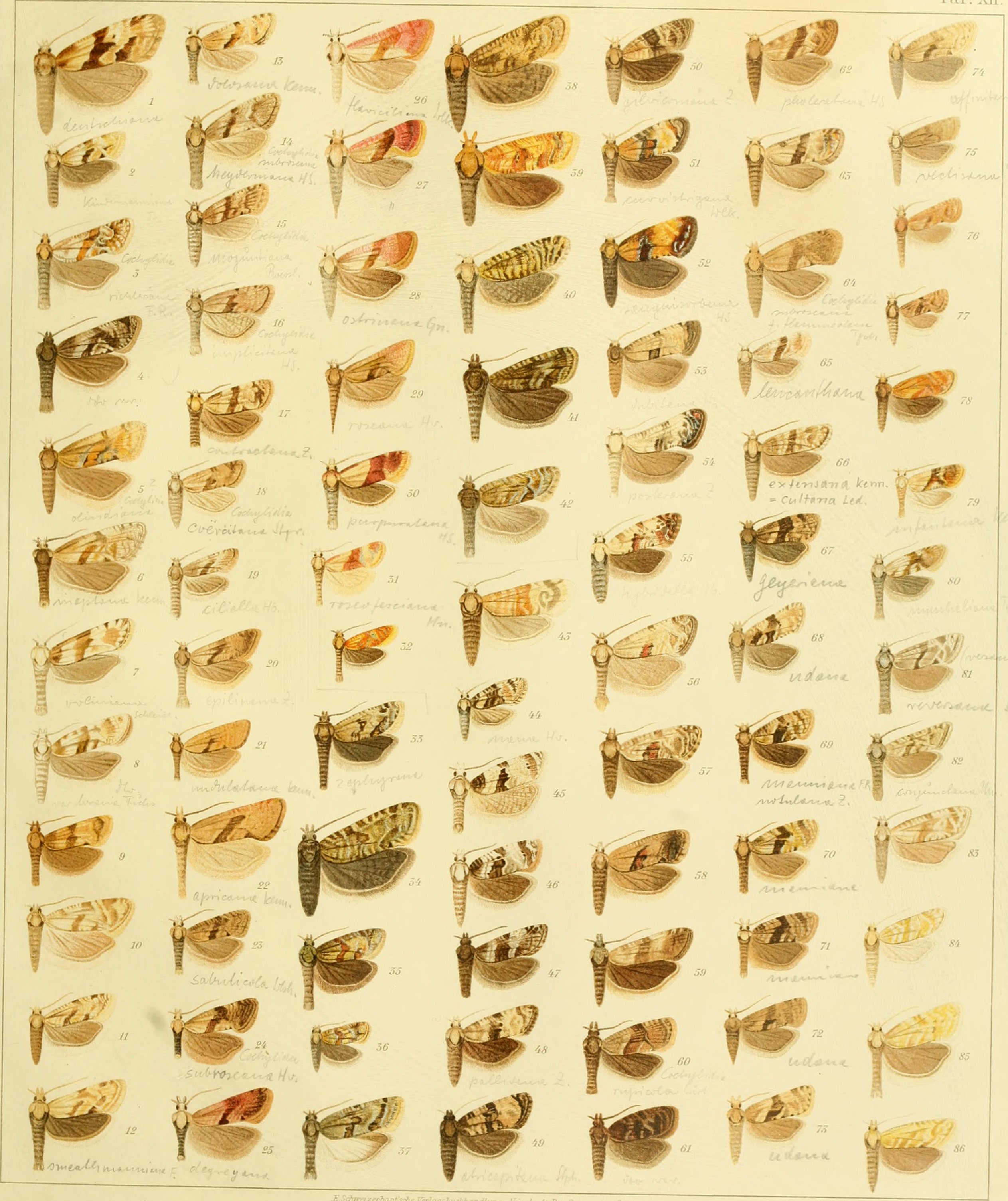
Gynnidomorpha permixtana figure 80 and related species

== Description ==
The wingspan is 8–12 mm and they are on the wing nearly all year round. Very similar to Phalonidia manniana Fischer von Röslerstamm, 1839. It differs as follows: forewings with markings broader, more indistinct and suffused, median fascia marked with dark fuscous on posterior edge in middle.

The larvae feed in the stems of water-plantains (Alisma species), gentians (Gentiana species), eyebrights (Euphrasia species) and louseworts (Pedicularis species).

== Life cycle ==
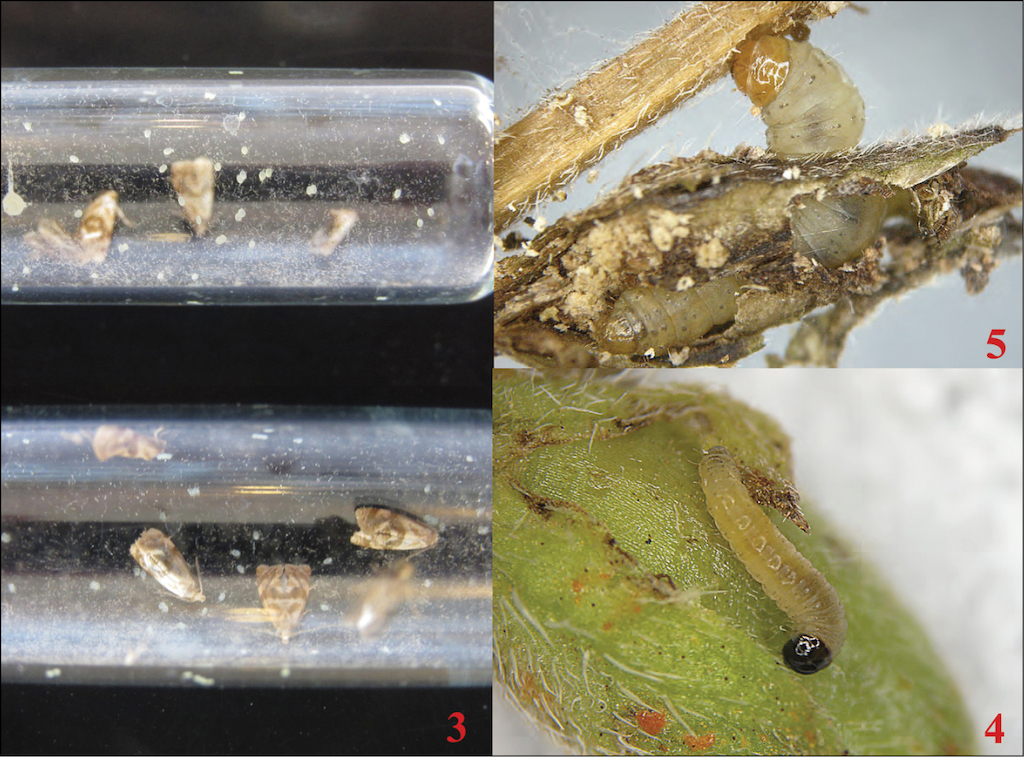
3. eggs; 4. early instar larva; 5. final instar larva

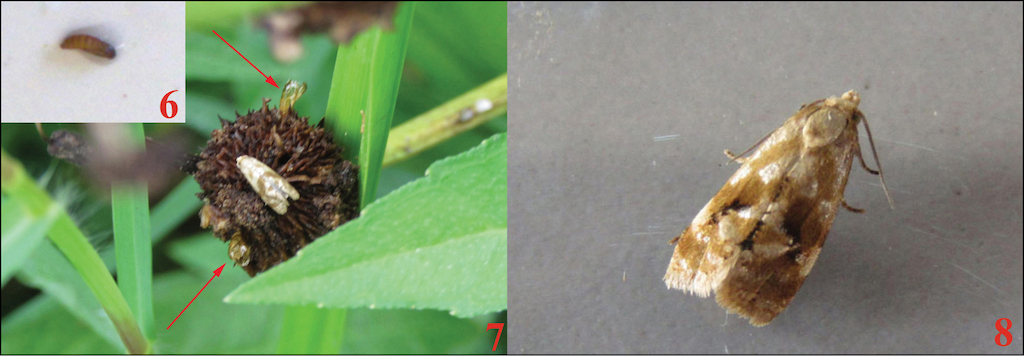
6. pupa; 7. newly emerged adult

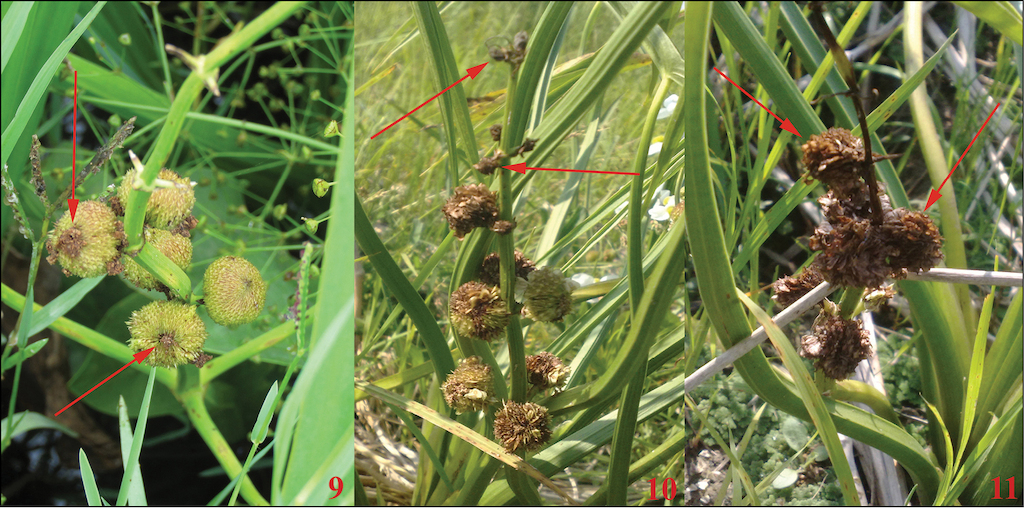
Damage 9. one week after hatching; 10. two weeks; 11. three weeks

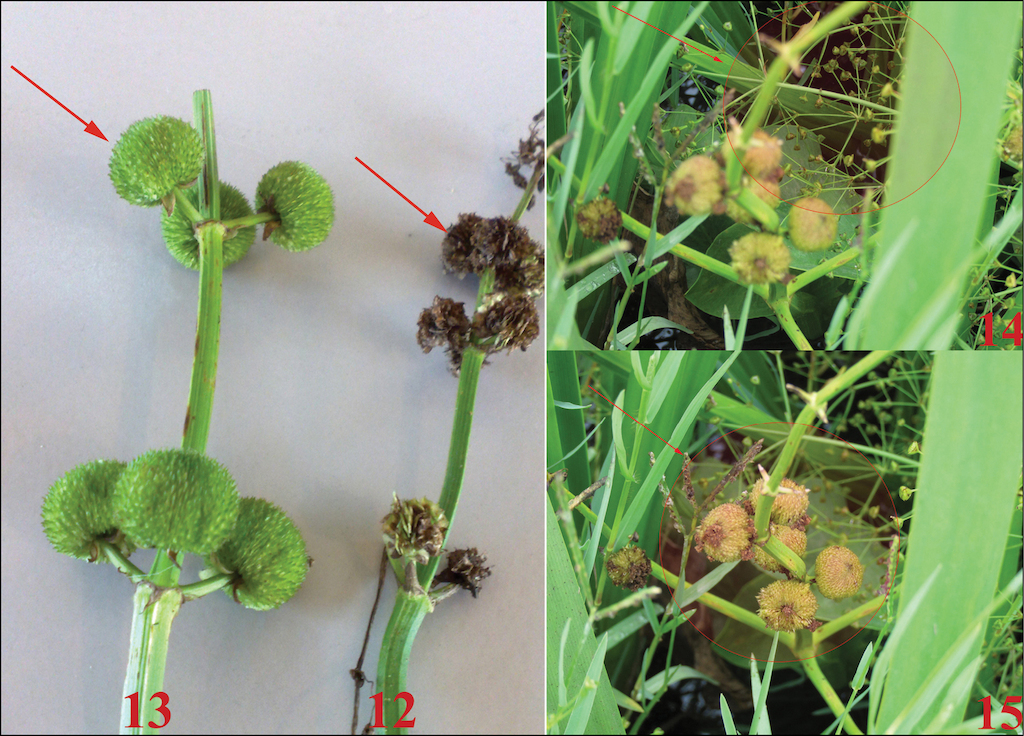
12. infested fruits; 13. uninfested fruits; 14. uninfested Alisma seeds; 15. infested Sagittaria seeds
