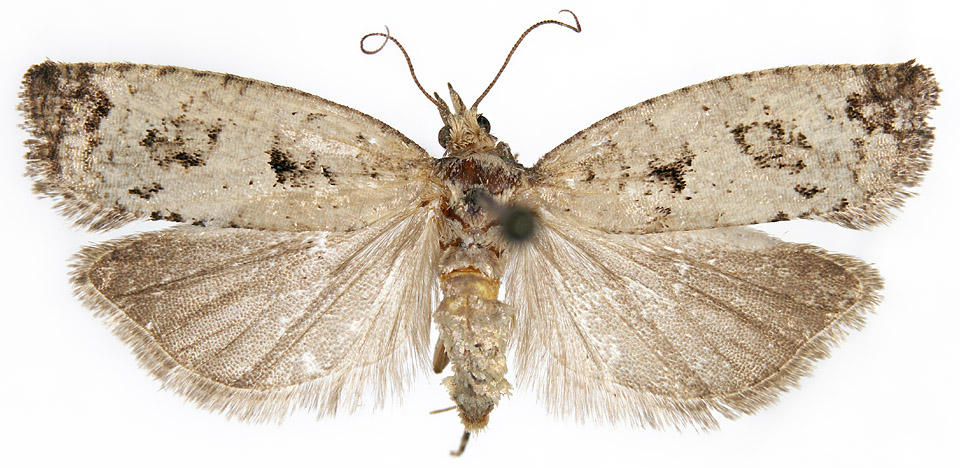

Scientific classification
- Kingdom: Animalia
- Phylum: Arthropoda
- Class: Insecta
- Order: Lepidoptera
- Family: Tortricidae
- Genus: Epinotia
- Species: E. brunnichana

Binomial name
- Epinotia brunnichana (Linnaeus, 1767)

Synonyms
- Phalaena (Tortrix) brunnichana Linnaeus, 1767; Eucosma brunnichana ab. albodorsana Sheldon, 1935; Eucosma brunnichana ab. brunneana Sheldon, 1935; Eucosma brunnichana ab. brunneodorsana Sheldon, 1935; Eucosma brunnichella Kloet & Hincks, 1945; Tortrix brunnichiana [Denis & Schiffermuller], 1775; Epiblema brunnichianum ab. ochreana Hauder, 1918; Ephippiphora rectana Peyerimhoff, 1863; Tortrix sinuana [Denis & Schiffermuller], 1775

= Epinotia brunnichana =

Species of moth

Epinotia brunnichana is a moth of the family Tortricidae. It is found in most western, central and northern Europe, the Near East and further east to the eastern Palearctic realm, where it has been recorded from Russia, Kazakhstan, China, and Japan.

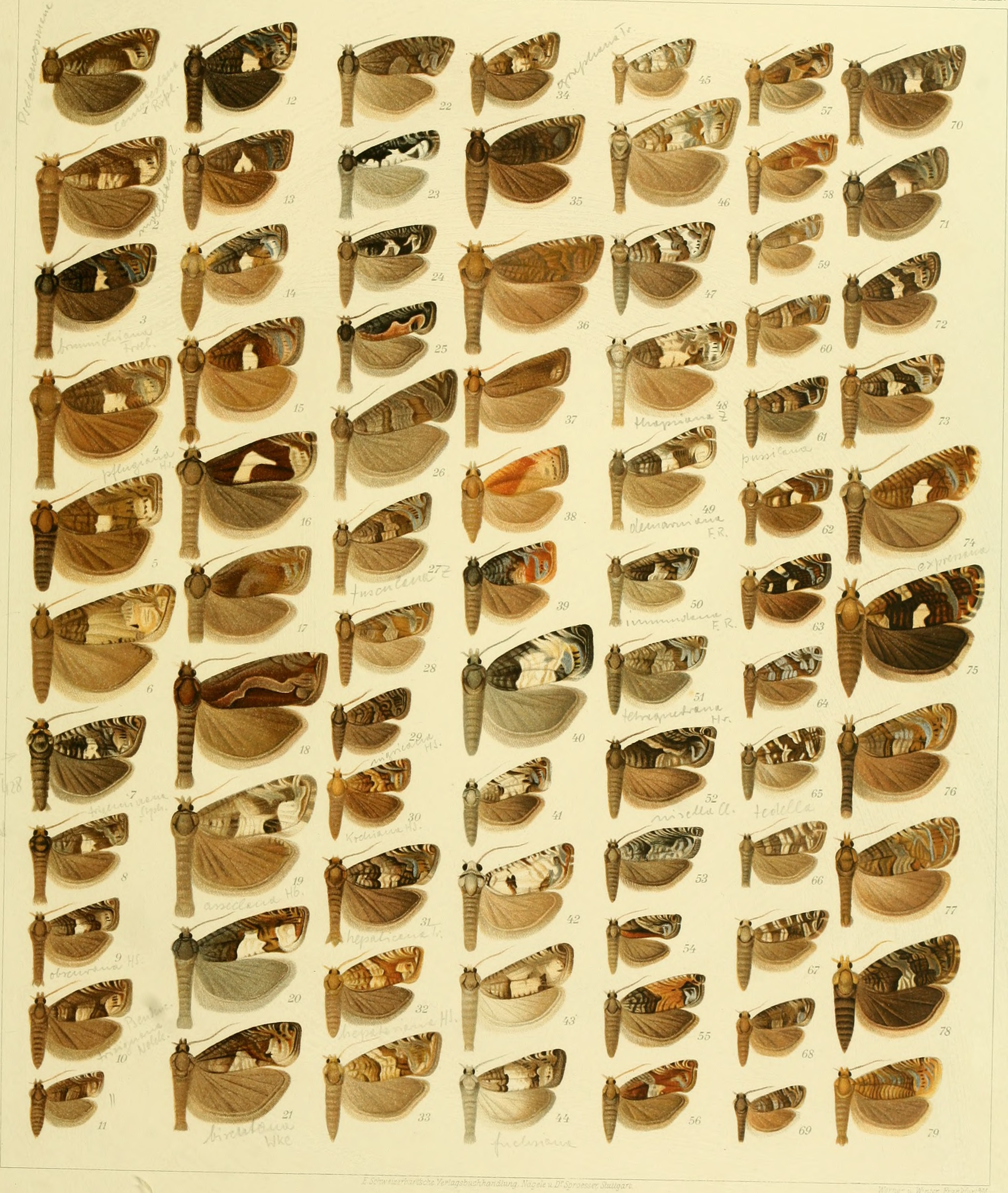
Plate illustrating Epinotia brunnichana fig 3 and related species

The wingspan is 18–22 millimetres (0.7–0.9 in).

Adults are on wing from July to October depending on the location.

The larvae roll the leaves of Betula, Corylus and Salix species and feed inside.
