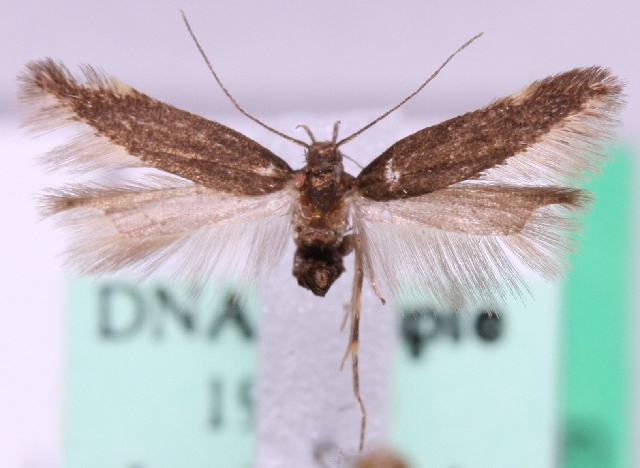

Scientific classification
- Kingdom: Animalia
- Phylum: Arthropoda
- Clade: Pancrustacea
- Class: Insecta
- Order: Lepidoptera
- Family: Gelechiidae
- Genus: Eulamprotes
- Species: E. plumbella

Binomial name
- Eulamprotes plumbella (Heinemann, 1870)

Synonyms
- Lamprotes plumbella Heinemann, 1870

= Eulamprotes plumbella =

Species of moth

Eulamprotes plumbella is a moth of the family Gelechiidae. It has a local distribution in central and northern Europe.

The wingspan is 10–11 mm. Adults are on wing from June to July.
