= Scoparia gallica =

Scientific classification
- Kingdom: Animalia
- Phylum: Arthropoda
- Class: Insecta
- Order: Lepidoptera
- Family: Crambidae
- Genus: Scoparia
- Species: S. gallica

Binomial name
- Scoparia gallica Peyerimhoff, 1873

Synonyms
- Scoparia ancipitalis Zerny, 1935; Scoparia talboti Schmidt, 1934

Species of moth

Scoparia gallica is a species of moth in the family Crambidae. It is found in France, Spain and Switzerland.

The wingspan is 25–27 mm for males and 20–23 mm for females.
