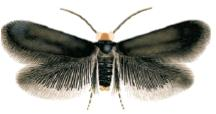

Scientific classification
- Kingdom: Animalia
- Phylum: Arthropoda
- Class: Insecta
- Order: Lepidoptera
- Family: Nepticulidae
- Genus: Stigmella
- Species: S. suberivora

Binomial name
- Stigmella suberivora (Stainton, 1869)

Synonyms
- Nepticula suberivora Stainton, 1869; Nepticula aureocapitella Millière, 1870; Nepticula ilicivora Peyerimhoff, 1871; Nepticula ilicella Walsingham, 1891

= Stigmella suberivora =

Species of moth

Stigmella suberivora is a moth of the family Nepticulidae. It is widespread in the western Mediterranean region, where it is found in Portugal, Spain, southern France (along the Atlantic coast northwards to Brittany), Italy, Corsica, Sardinia, Sicily, the Adriatic coast in Slovenia, Croatia and Bosnia. It is also found in North Africa, including Algeria and Tunisia. It is an introduced and established species in southern England. Records of leafmines in Mallorca are probably also this species.

The wingspan is 4.8-7.1 mm. Adults are on wing from April to October.

The larvae feed on Quercus coccifera, Quercus ilex, Quercus ilex rotundifolia and Quercus suber. They mine the leaves of their host plant.
