= Gynnidomorpha curviphalla =

Scientific classification
- Domain: Eukaryota
- Kingdom: Animalia
- Phylum: Arthropoda
- Class: Insecta
- Order: Lepidoptera
- Family: Tortricidae
- Genus: Gynnidomorpha
- Species: G. curviphalla

Binomial name
- Gynnidomorpha curviphalla Y.H. Sun & H.H. Li, 2013

Species of moth

Gynnidomorpha curviphalla is a species of moth of the family Tortricidae. It is found in China (Beijing, Guizhou, Hebei, Henan, Tianjin).

The wingspan is 12−13 mm.
