= Eulamprotes ochricapilla =

Scientific classification
- Domain: Eukaryota
- Kingdom: Animalia
- Phylum: Arthropoda
- Class: Insecta
- Order: Lepidoptera
- Family: Gelechiidae
- Genus: Eulamprotes
- Species: E. ochricapilla

Binomial name
- Eulamprotes ochricapilla (Rebel, 1903)

Synonyms
- Argyritis ochricapilla Rebel, 1903; Eulamprotes buvati Leraut, 1991

Species of moth

Eulamprotes ochricapilla is a moth of the family Gelechiidae. It was described by Rebel in 1903. It is found in France, Italy, the Czech Republic, Slovakia and Romania.

The wingspan is 9–10 mm (0.35–0.39 in). The forewings are deep black with whitish-yellow markings. The hindwings are dark grey.
