= Gynnidomorpha mesoxutha =

Scientific classification
- Domain: Eukaryota
- Kingdom: Animalia
- Phylum: Arthropoda
- Class: Insecta
- Order: Lepidoptera
- Family: Tortricidae
- Genus: Gynnidomorpha
- Species: G. mesoxutha

Binomial name
- Gynnidomorpha mesoxutha Turner, 1916

Synonyms
- Gynnidomorpha melissa Razowski, 1982; Gynnidomorpha melitta Razowski, 1970; Phalonia mellita Meyrick, 1916

Species of moth

Gynnidomorpha mesoxutha is a species of moth of the family Tortricidae. It is found in Sri Lanka, India and northern Australia.

The wingspan is about 11 mm. The forewings are whitish ochreous with ochreous-brown markings. The hindwings are pale grey.
