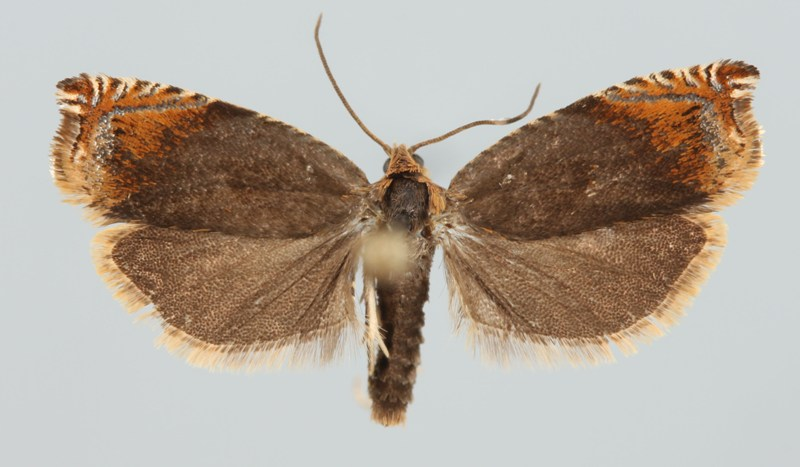

Scientific classification
- Domain: Eukaryota
- Kingdom: Animalia
- Phylum: Arthropoda
- Class: Insecta
- Order: Lepidoptera
- Family: Tortricidae
- Genus: Ancylis
- Species: A. upupana

Binomial name
- Ancylis upupana (Treitschke, 1835)

Synonyms
- Phoxopteris upupana Treitschke, 1835; Phoxopteris castaneana Peyerimhoff, 1863

= Ancylis upupana =

Species of moth

Ancylis upupana is a moth of the family Tortricidae. It is found in most of Europe (except Iceland, Ireland, the Iberian Peninsula and most of the Balkan Peninsula), east to Russia and China.

The wingspan is 13–20 mm. Adults are on wing from May to June. There is one generation per year.

The larvae feed on Ulmus, Betula and Quercus. They spin a folded leaf or multiple leaves together into a pod and feed from within. It partly skeletonises the leaves.
