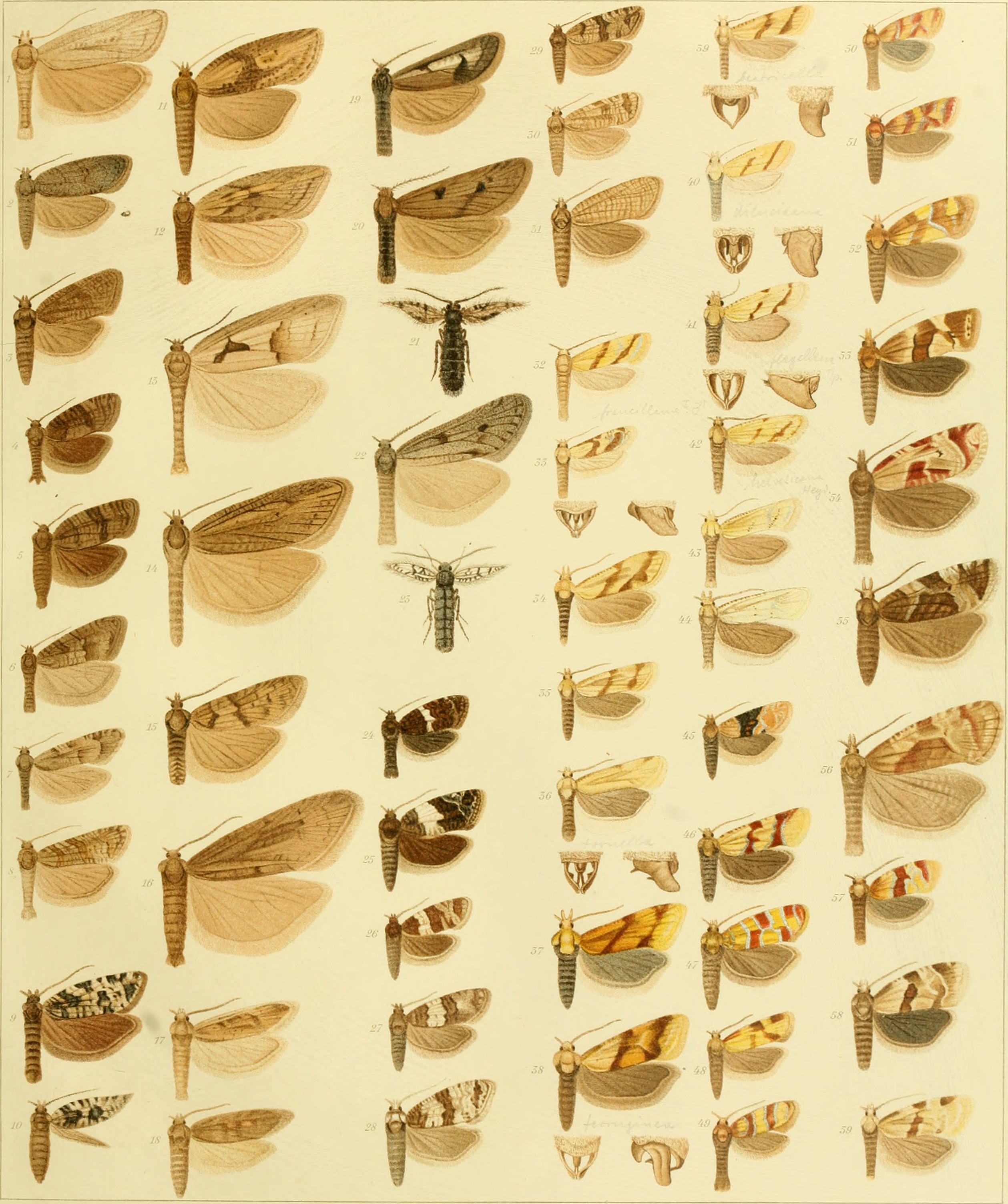
- Aethes deaurana as Lozopera deaurana in Die palaearktischen tortriciden (figure 37)

Scientific classification
- Domain: Eukaryota
- Kingdom: Animalia
- Phylum: Arthropoda
- Class: Insecta
- Order: Lepidoptera
- Family: Tortricidae
- Genus: Aethes
- Species: A. deaurana

Binomial name
- Aethes deaurana (Peyerimhoff, 1877)

Synonyms
- Cochylis deaurana Peyerimhoff, 1877; Lozopera fasciella Turati, 1924; Lozopera fusciella Turati, 1924

= Aethes deaurana =

Species of moth

Aethes deaurana is a moth of the family Tortricidae. It was described by Henri de Peyerimhoff in 1877. It is found in Portugal, Spain, the Pyrenees, southern France, Dalmatia, Sardinia, Algeria, Libya and Syria. The moth is a rare migrant to the south of England and may be resident in south Devon and Dorset.

The wingspan is 15–19 millimetres (0.59–0.75 in).

The larvae feed inside the stems of umbelliferous plants such as alexanders (Smyrnium olusatrum) and Chelonus inanitus.
