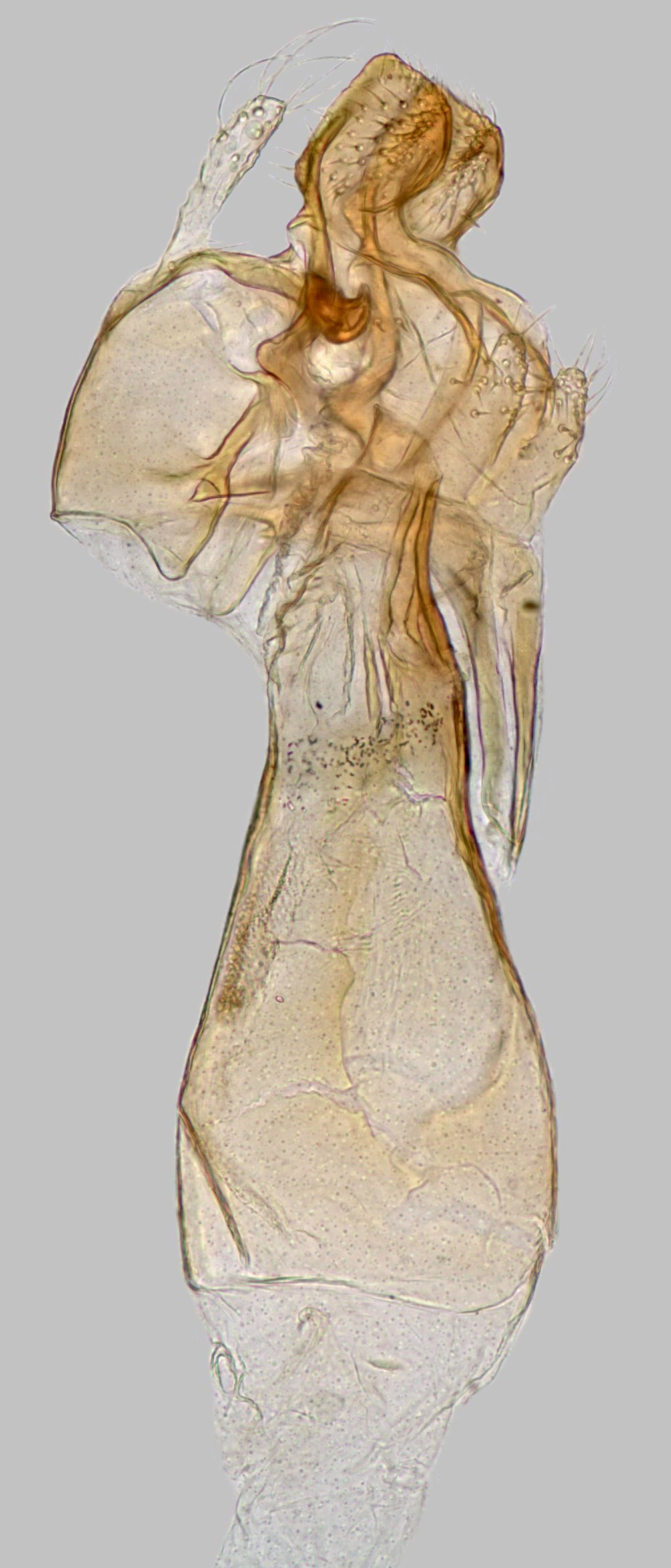
- genitalic preparation

Scientific classification
- Kingdom: Animalia
- Phylum: Arthropoda
- Class: Insecta
- Order: Lepidoptera
- Family: Gelechiidae
- Genus: Eulamprotes
- Species: E. immaculatella

Binomial name
- Eulamprotes immaculatella (Douglas, 1850)

Synonyms
- Gelechia immaculatella Douglas, 1850; Eulamprotes phaeella Heckford & Langmaid, 1988

= Eulamprotes immaculatella =

Species of moth

Eulamprotes immaculatella is a moth of the family Gelechiidae. It was described by John William Douglas in 1850. It is found in Ireland, Great Britain, Portugal, Spain, France, the Netherlands, Germany and Denmark. It is found in a wide range of habitats, including sea cliffs, damp meadows, limestone pavements and grasslands.

The wingspan is 8–13 mm. Resembles other small dark gelechiids with pale markings on the costa. Only confirmed by microscopic examination of the genitalia.

Adults are on wing from June to September.

The larvae feed within the stem of Hypericum species.
