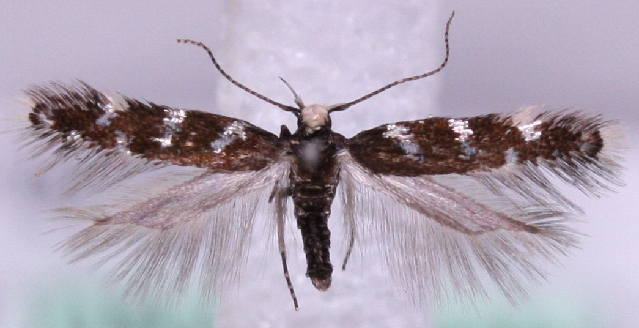
- Adult specimen preserved in the University of Oulu, Finland

Scientific classification
- Kingdom: Animalia
- Phylum: Arthropoda
- Clade: Pancrustacea
- Class: Insecta
- Order: Lepidoptera
- Family: Gelechiidae
- Genus: Eulamprotes
- Species: E. superbella

Binomial name
- Eulamprotes superbella (Zeller, 1839)

Synonyms
- Gelechia (Brahmia) superbella Zeller, 1839

= Eulamprotes superbella =

Species of moth

Eulamprotes superbella is a species of moth in the family Gelechiidae. It is widely distributed in Europe, from the Alps to northern Europe. Outside Europe it is found in Turkey, the Caucasus, Siberia (Transbaikalia) and Mongolia. The wingspan is 6–7 mm. Adults are on wing from April to June. The larvae feed on Thymus serpyllum and Gnaphalium species.
