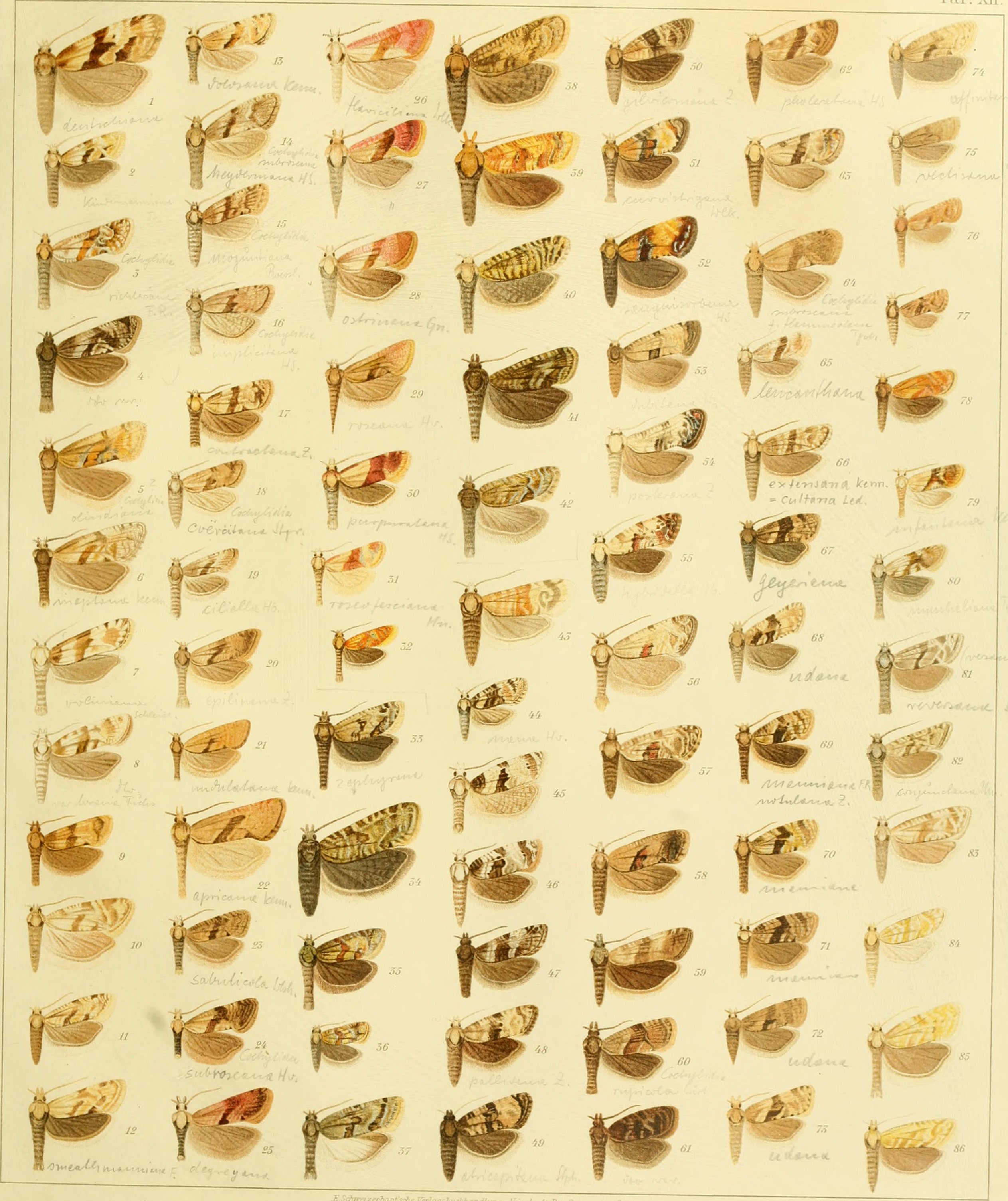
- in Kennel Die palaearktischen tortriciden figure 78

Scientific classification
- Kingdom: Animalia
- Phylum: Arthropoda
- Class: Insecta
- Order: Lepidoptera
- Family: Tortricidae
- Genus: Gynnidomorpha
- Species: G. rubricana

Binomial name
- Gynnidomorpha rubricana (Peyerimhoff, 1877)

Synonyms
- Cochylis rubricana Peyerimhoff, 1877; Phalonidia rubricana

= Gynnidomorpha rubricana =

Species of moth

Gynnidomorpha rubricana is a species of moth of the family Tortricidae first described by Henri de Peyerimhoff in 1877. It is found in China (Jilin), Korea and parts of Europe, including Spain, France, Italy and Croatia.

The wingspan is 11–13 mm. Adults are on wing from May to July.
