= Gynnidomorpha pista =

Scientific classification
- Domain: Eukaryota
- Kingdom: Animalia
- Phylum: Arthropoda
- Class: Insecta
- Order: Lepidoptera
- Family: Tortricidae
- Genus: Gynnidomorpha
- Species: G. pista

Binomial name
- Gynnidomorpha pista (Diakonoff, 1984)

Synonyms
- Phalonidia pista Diakonoff, 1984; Piercea pista

Species of moth

Gynnidomorpha pista is a species of moth of the family Tortricidae. It is found in China (Anhui, Beijing, Fujian, Guangxi, Guizhou, Hainan, Hong Kong, Liaoning, Tianjin).

The wingspan is 10−14 mm.
