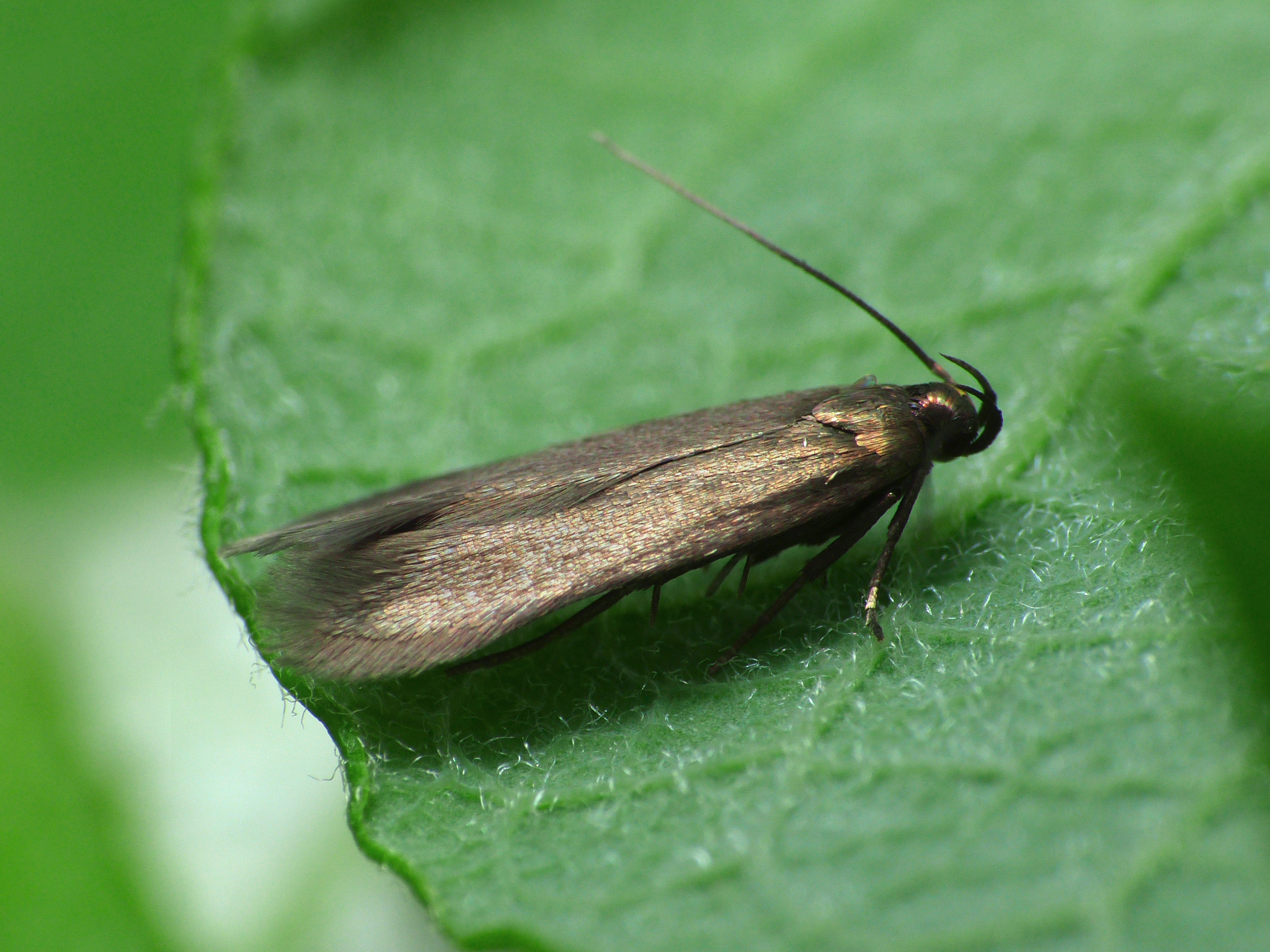

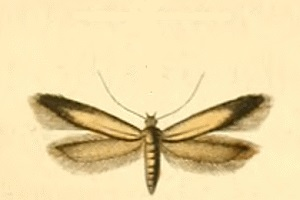

Scientific classification
- Kingdom: Animalia
- Phylum: Arthropoda
- Class: Insecta
- Order: Lepidoptera
- Family: Gelechiidae
- Genus: Eulamprotes
- Species: E. unicolorella

Binomial name
- Eulamprotes unicolorella (Duponchel, 1843)

Synonyms
- Lita unicolorella Duponchel, 1843; Gelechia sircomella Stainton, 1854; Aristotelia lucentella Peyerimhoff, 1871

= Eulamprotes unicolorella =

Species of moth

Eulamprotes unicolorella, the unmarked neb, is a moth of the family Gelechiidae. It was described by Philogène Auguste Joseph Duponchel in 1843. It is found in almost all of Europe. The habitat consists of wastelands and dry open areas.

The wingspan is 10–13 mm. The forewings are bronzy-black, somewhat lighter basally; a nearly straight narrow white fascia beyond middle. Hindwings fuscous, darker posteriorly. Under-surface with white fascia distinct across forewings and forming a costal spot on hindwings. The larva is pale ochreous-yellowish; 3-12 with broad dull red transverse bands, on 3 and 4 somewhat interrupted; head yellow - brown; plate of 2 yellow brown, posteriorly blackish marked.

Adults are on wing from May to July.

The larvae feed within the stems of Hypericum perforatum.
