= Gynnidomorpha julianiensis =

Scientific classification
- Domain: Eukaryota
- Kingdom: Animalia
- Phylum: Arthropoda
- Class: Insecta
- Order: Lepidoptera
- Family: Tortricidae
- Genus: Gynnidomorpha
- Species: G. julianiensis

Binomial name
- Gynnidomorpha julianiensis (Liu & Ge, 1991)

Synonyms
- Phalonidia julianiensis Liu & Ge, 1991

Species of moth

Gynnidomorpha julianiensis is a species of moth of the family Tortricidae. It is found in China (Guizhou, Hunan, Jiangxi).

The wingspan is 10−12 mm.
