= Eulamprotes nigritella =

Scientific classification
- Kingdom: Animalia
- Phylum: Arthropoda
- Clade: Pancrustacea
- Class: Insecta
- Order: Lepidoptera
- Family: Gelechiidae
- Genus: Eulamprotes
- Species: E. nigritella

Binomial name
- Eulamprotes nigritella (Zeller, [1847])

Synonyms
- Gelechia nigritella Zeller, [1847]

Species of moth

Eulamprotes nigritella is a moth of the family Gelechiidae. It was described by Philipp Christoph Zeller in 1847. It is found on Malta, Sardinia and Sicily, as well as in Italy.
