= Eulamprotes graecatella =

Scientific classification
- Domain: Eukaryota
- Kingdom: Animalia
- Phylum: Arthropoda
- Class: Insecta
- Order: Lepidoptera
- Family: Gelechiidae
- Genus: Eulamprotes
- Species: E. graecatella

Binomial name
- Eulamprotes graecatella Šumpich & Skyva, 2012

Species of moth

Eulamprotes graecatella is a moth of the family Gelechiidae. It is found in Greece. The habitat consists of a salt marsh by the sea coast.

The wingspan is 10 mm for males and 12 mm for females.
