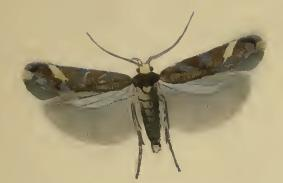
- Eulamprotes wilkella

Scientific classification
- Domain: Eukaryota
- Kingdom: Animalia
- Phylum: Arthropoda
- Class: Insecta
- Order: Lepidoptera
- Family: Gelechiidae
- Genus: Eulamprotes; Bradley, 1971

Synonyms
- Argyritis Heinemann, 1870 (junior homonym of Argyritis Hübner, 1821); Lamprotes Heinemann, 1870 (junior homonym of Lamprotes Reichenbach, 1817); Siderea Omelko, 1999

= Eulamprotes =

Genus of insects

Eulamprotes is a genus of moths in the family Gelechiidae.

== Species ==
- Eulamprotes altaicella Huemer & Karsholt, 2013
- Eulamprotes atrella (Denis & Schiffermuller, 1775)
- Eulamprotes atrifrontella Huemer & Karsholt, 2013
- Eulamprotes baldizzonei Huemer & Karsholt, 2013
- Eulamprotes gemerensis Elsner, 2013
- Eulamprotes graecatella Sumpich & Skyva, 2012
- Eulamprotes helotella (Staudinger, 1859)
- Eulamprotes immaculatella (Douglas, 1850)
- Eulamprotes isostacta (Meyrick, 1926)
- Eulamprotes kailai Huemer & Karsholt, 2013
- Eulamprotes libertinella (Zeller, 1872)
- Eulamprotes mirusella Huemer & Karsholt, 2013
- Eulamprotes nigritella (Zeller, 1847)
- Eulamprotes nigromaculella (Milliere, 1872)
- Eulamprotes occidentella Huemer & Karsholt, 2011
- Eulamprotes ochricapilla (Rebel, 1903)
- Eulamprotes parahelotella Nel, 1995
- Eulamprotes plumbella (Heinemann, 1870)
- Eulamprotes superbella (Zeller, 1839)
- Eulamprotes unicolorella (Duponchel, 1843)
- Eulamprotes wieseri Huemer & Karsholt, 2013
- Eulamprotes wilkella (Linnaeus, 1758)

== Former species ==
- Eulamprotes buvati Leraut, 1991
