= Eulamprotes occidentella =

Scientific classification
- Kingdom: Animalia
- Phylum: Arthropoda
- Clade: Pancrustacea
- Class: Insecta
- Order: Lepidoptera
- Family: Gelechiidae
- Genus: Eulamprotes
- Species: E. occidentella

Binomial name
- Eulamprotes occidentella Huemer & Karsholt, 2011

Species of moth

Eulamprotes occidentella is a moth of the family Gelechiidae. It was described by Peter Huemer and Ole Karsholt in 2011. It is found in the south-western Alps of France and Italy (Cottian Alps).
