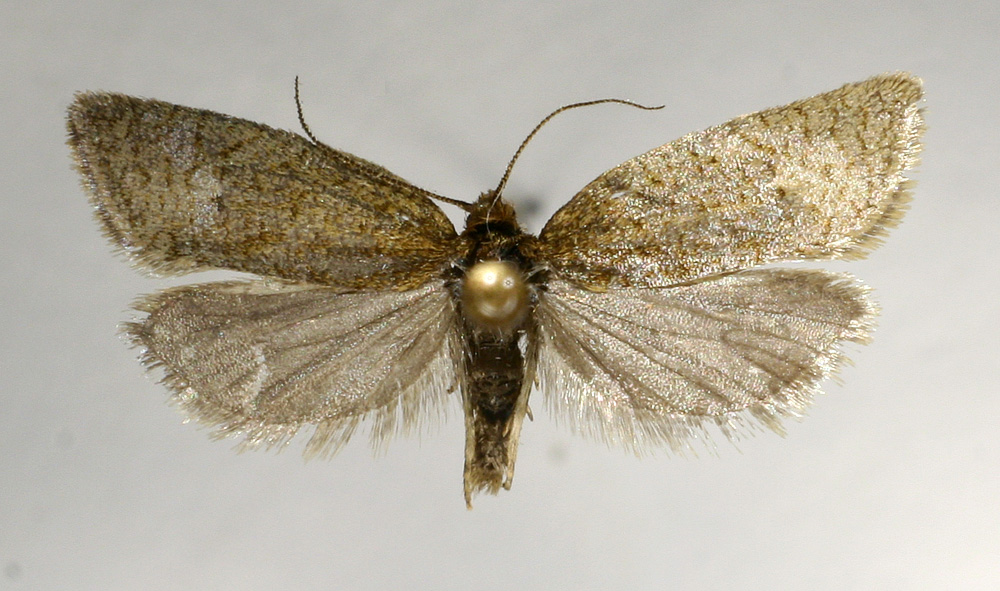

Scientific classification
- Kingdom: Animalia
- Phylum: Arthropoda
- Clade: Pancrustacea
- Class: Insecta
- Order: Lepidoptera
- Family: Tortricidae
- Genus: Clepsis
- Species: C. senecionana

Binomial name
- Clepsis senecionana (Hübner, 1819)

Synonyms
- Tortrix senecionana Hubner, [1818-1819]; Tortrix culmana Peyerimhoff, 1863; Tortrix helvolana Frolich, 1828; Tortrix porcana Zetterstedt, 1839; Tortrix pulverana Eversmann, 1844; Tortrix rusticana Hubner, [1796-1799]; Tortrix stagnana Charpentier, 1821; Tortrix stramineana Zetterstedt, 1839

= Clepsis senecionana =

Species of moth

Clepsis senecionana, the rustic tortrix, is a moth of the family Tortricidae. It is found from Europe to eastern Siberia.

The wingspan is 13–16 mm.

Adults are on wing from May to June.

The larvae feed on Convallaria, Dorycnium, Gentianella amarella, Lotus, Lysimachia, Myrica, Polygonatum, Onobrychis viccifolia and Vaccinium myrtillus. In Scotland it has also been recorded on Picea, Pinus and Larix.
