= Argyresthia chrysidella =

Scientific classification
- Kingdom: Animalia
- Phylum: Arthropoda
- Clade: Pancrustacea
- Class: Insecta
- Order: Lepidoptera
- Family: Argyresthiidae
- Genus: Argyresthia
- Species: A. chrysidella

Binomial name
- Argyresthia chrysidella Peyerimhoff, 1877

Synonyms
- Argyresthia (Blastotere) chrysidella

Species of moth

Argyresthia chrysidella is a moth of the family Yponomeutidae. It is found in France.

The wingspan is 14–15 mm.
