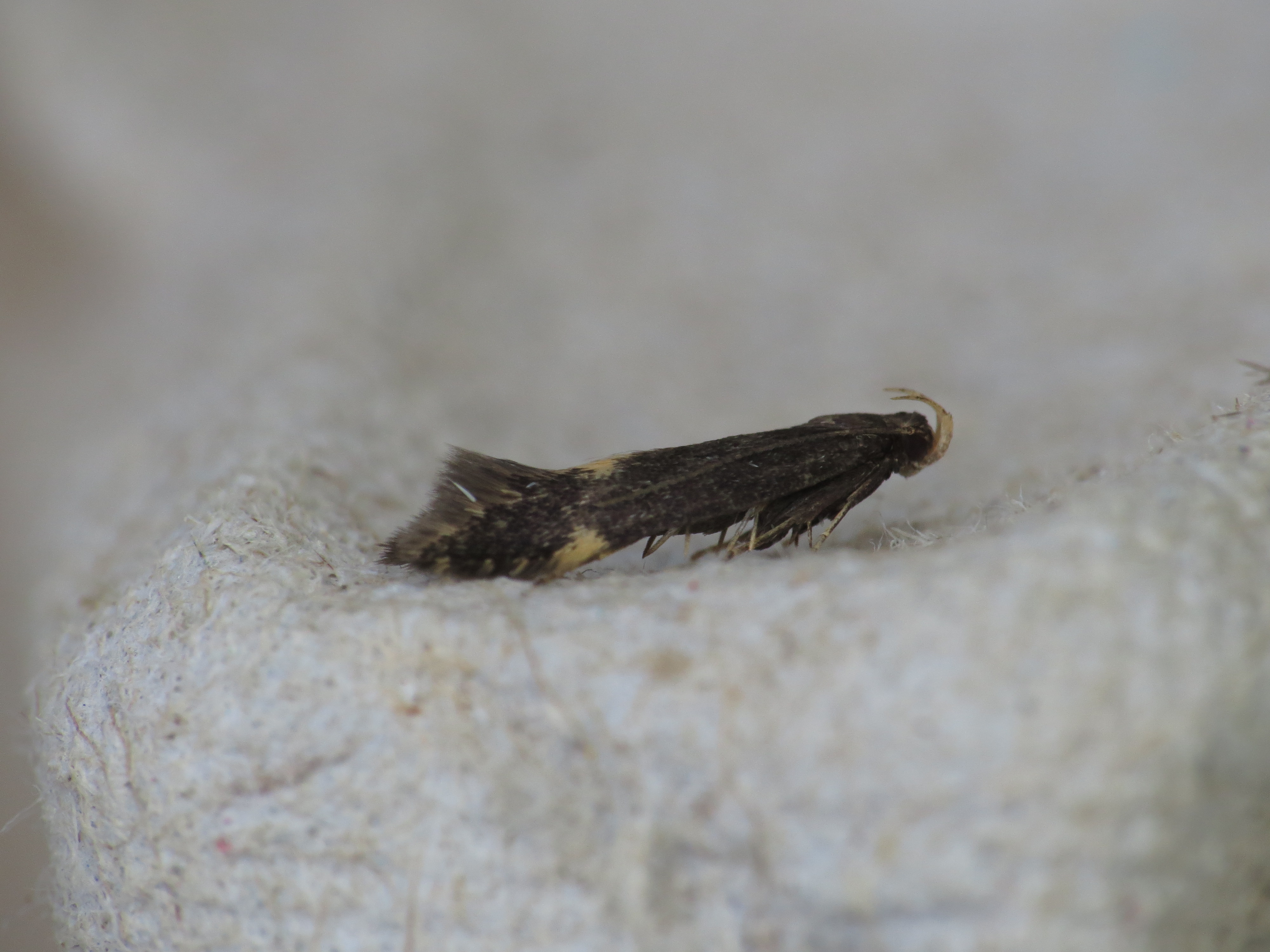

Scientific classification
- Kingdom: Animalia
- Phylum: Arthropoda
- Clade: Pancrustacea
- Class: Insecta
- Order: Lepidoptera
- Family: Gelechiidae
- Genus: Eulamprotes
- Species: E. atrella

Binomial name
- Eulamprotes atrella (Denis & Schiffermüller, 1775)

Synonyms
- Tinea atrella Denis & Schiffermüller, 1775; Tinea quadripunctella Fabricius, 1794; Anacampsis umbriferella Herrich-Schäffer, 1854; Anacampsis aurimaculella Höfner, 1896; Aristotelia ornata Dufrane, 1942

= Eulamprotes atrella =

Species of moth

Eulamprotes atrella, the two-spotted neb, is a moth of the family Gelechiidae. It was described by Michael Denis and Ignaz Schiffermüller in 1775. It is found from most of Europe, east to Japan. The habitat consists of mixed deciduous woodlands.

The wingspan is 10.8–13 mm. Adults are on wing from May to August in one generation per year. Palpi pale yellowish. Forewings dark purplish-fuscous; a triangular whitish-ochreous tornal spot, and another on costa beyond it. Hindwings grey. Larva pale whitish-green; head very pale brown; 2 with a grey plate and two black spots. Pupa in a flat case formed of a portion of the mined stem.

The larvae feed on Hypericum species, including Hypericum maculatum.
