= Gynnidomorpha mesotypa =

Scientific classification
- Kingdom: Animalia
- Phylum: Arthropoda
- Class: Insecta
- Order: Lepidoptera
- Family: Tortricidae
- Genus: Gynnidomorpha
- Species: G. mesotypa

Binomial name
- Gynnidomorpha mesotypa (Razowski, 1970)

Synonyms
- Phalonidia mesotypa Razowski, 1970; Piercea mesotypa

Species of moth

Gynnidomorpha mesotypa is a species of moth of the family Tortricidae. It is found in China (Guizhou, Jiangsu, Shaanxi, Shanghai) and Japan.

The wingspan is 13–14 mm.

The larvae feed on Sagittaria species.
