= Eulamprotes helotella =

Scientific classification
- Domain: Eukaryota
- Kingdom: Animalia
- Phylum: Arthropoda
- Class: Insecta
- Order: Lepidoptera
- Family: Gelechiidae
- Genus: Eulamprotes
- Species: E. helotella

Binomial name
- Eulamprotes helotella (Staudinger, 1859)

Synonyms
- Gelechia helotella Staudinger, 1859; Bryotropha damonella Millière, 1876; Bryotropha damonella Millière, 1875; Gelechia algeriella Baker, 1888; Xystophora striatopunctella Rebel, 1891

Species of moth

Eulamprotes helotella is a moth of the family Gelechiidae. It is found in Spain, Portugal, France, Italy, Greece, Corsica, Sardinia, and Crete. It is also found in North Africa.

The wingspan is 16–17 mm. The forewings are light fuscous, more or less densely irrorated (speckled) with whitish and darker fuscous and with a cloudy, obscure, dark fuscous, sub-elongate dot in the middle of the disc, and a second before three-fourths. The hindwings are grey.
