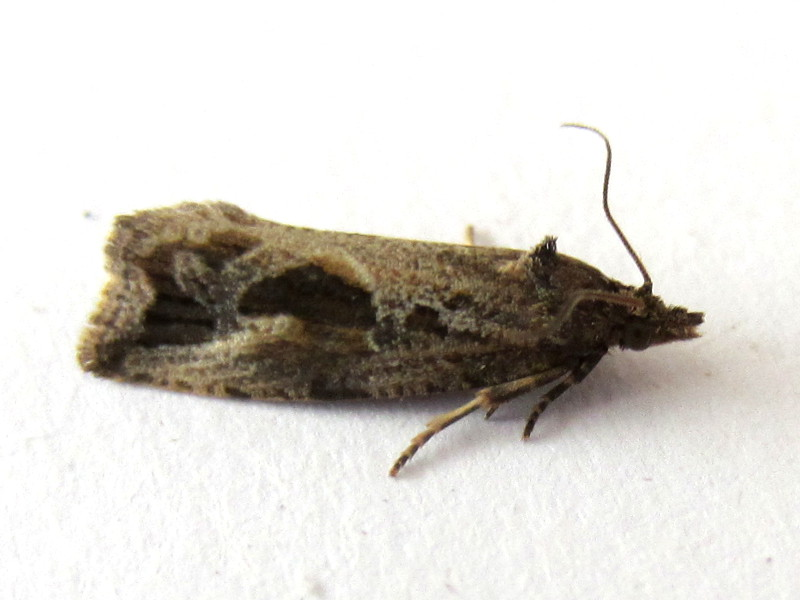

Scientific classification
- Kingdom: Animalia
- Phylum: Arthropoda
- Class: Insecta
- Order: Lepidoptera
- Family: Tortricidae
- Genus: Endothenia
- Species: E. quadrimaculana

Binomial name
- Endothenia quadrimaculana (Oku, 1963)

Synonyms
- Tortrix quadrimaculana Haworth, [1811]; Tortrix antiguana Hubner, [1811-1813]; Eutrachia antiquana Hubner, 1822; Olethreutes antiquana ab. efflorana Krulikowsky, 1908; Olethreutes antiquana ab. erebana Krulikowsky, 1908; Argyroploce helvinana Kennel, 1900; Olethreutes antiquana ab. meinhardiana Krulikowsky, 1908; Orthotaenia obesana Peyerimhoff, 1863; Argyroploce antiquana var. pallidana Caradja, 1916; Argyroploce pallidana Kennel, 1919

= Endothenia quadrimaculana =

Species of moth

Endothenia quadrimaculana is a moth of the family Tortricidae. It is found from northern and central Europe to Siberia and south-eastern Russia, Mongolia and China. Subspecies nubilana is found in North America.

The wingspan is 18–22 mm. The ground colour of the forewings is light brown with small dark brown spots along the costal edge, a square brown spot in the middle of the wing and an inward-curved brown cross-band at the tip. The hindwings are light brown. Dissection of the genitalia is necessary to determine Endothenia species with certainty.

In France and Switzerland, there are two generations per year. Adults are on wing in May and June and again in August and September.

The larvae feed on Mentha spicata, Mentha arvensis, Lamium album, Stachys palustris, Stachys arvensis, Stachys recta and Symphytum officinale.

== Subspecies ==
- Endothenia quadrimaculana quadrimaculana (Eurasia)
- Endothenia quadrimaculana nubilana (North America)
