= Crinopteryx =

Scientific classification
- Kingdom: Animalia
- Phylum: Arthropoda
- Class: Insecta
- Order: Lepidoptera
- Family: Incurvariidae
- Subfamily: Crinopteryginae; Spuler, 1898
- Genus: Crinopteryx; Peyerimhoff, 1871
- Species: C. familiella

Binomial name
- Crinopteryx familiella Peyerimhoff, 1871

Genus of moths

Crinopteryx is a monotypic genus of primitive monotrysian moths. Its sole species, Crinopteryx familiella, is endemic to Europe, where it is restricted to the Mediterranean region of France, Italy, the Iberian Peninsula and Sicily. Crinopteryx used to be classified in its own, monotypic family called Crinopterygidae, but the latter has been downgraded to a subfamily (Crinopteryginae) of the family Incurvariidae.

Crinopteryx familiella is a small moth, about 7 mm in wingspan, and its morphological characters are rather unusual for the superfamily Adeloidea. For example, the caterpillar bears a case (see also Coleophoridae, feeding on rockrose (Cistus shrubs) (Rosaceae) (Davis, 1999: 83), and especially Cistus salviifolius.
