= Gynnidomorpha datetis =

Scientific classification
- Domain: Eukaryota
- Kingdom: Animalia
- Phylum: Arthropoda
- Class: Insecta
- Order: Lepidoptera
- Family: Tortricidae
- Genus: Gynnidomorpha
- Species: G. datetis

Binomial name
- Gynnidomorpha datetis (Diakonoff, 1984)

Synonyms
- Phalonidia datetis Diakonoff, 1984; Piercea datesis Razowski, 1992

Species of moth

Gynnidomorpha datetis is a species of moth of the family Tortricidae. It is found in China in the provinces of Anhui, Guizhou, Hebei, Henan, Shandong, Shaanxi, Tianjin as well as Thailand.

The wingspan is 10.5−13 mm.
