= Gynnidomorpha stirodelphys =

Scientific classification
- Domain: Eukaryota
- Kingdom: Animalia
- Phylum: Arthropoda
- Class: Insecta
- Order: Lepidoptera
- Family: Tortricidae
- Genus: Gynnidomorpha
- Species: G. stirodelphys

Binomial name
- Gynnidomorpha stirodelphys (Diakonoff, 1976)

Synonyms
- Cochylis stirodelphys Diakonoff, 1976; Phalonidia stirodelphys

Species of moth

Gynnidomorpha stirodelphys is a species of moth of the family Tortricidae. It is found in Nepal.
