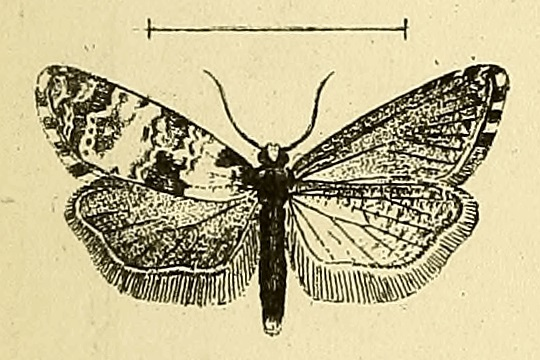

Scientific classification
- Kingdom: Animalia
- Phylum: Arthropoda
- Clade: Pancrustacea
- Class: Insecta
- Order: Lepidoptera
- Family: Tortricidae
- Genus: Cochylis
- Species: C. salebrana

Binomial name
- Cochylis salebrana Mann, 1862

Synonyms
- Cochylis millierana Peyerimhoff, 1877

= Cochylis salebrana =

Species of moth

Cochylis salebrana is a species of moth of the family Tortricidae. It is found on Sardinia and Sicily and in Portugal, Spain, France, Italy, Romania, Bulgaria, Hungary, North Macedonia and Asia Minor and Daghestan.

The wingspan is 13–17 mm. Adults are on wing from May to August.
