= Gynnidomorpha definita =

Scientific classification
- Kingdom: Animalia
- Phylum: Arthropoda
- Class: Insecta
- Order: Lepidoptera
- Family: Tortricidae
- Genus: Gynnidomorpha
- Species: G. definita

Binomial name
- Gynnidomorpha definita (Meyrick, 1928)

Synonyms
- Phalonia definita Meyrick, 1928

Species of moth

Gynnidomorpha definita is a species of moth of the family Tortricidae. It is found in Assam, India.
