= Eulamprotes kailai =

Scientific classification
- Kingdom: Animalia
- Phylum: Arthropoda
- Clade: Pancrustacea
- Class: Insecta
- Order: Lepidoptera
- Family: Gelechiidae
- Genus: Eulamprotes
- Species: E. kailai

Binomial name
- Eulamprotes kailai Huemer & Karsholt, 2013

Species of moth

Eulamprotes kailai is a moth of the family Gelechiidae. It was described by Peter Huemer and Ole Karsholt in 2013. It is found in Kazakhstan, Kyrgyzstan and Russia (Buryatia, Tuva).
