= Epinotia rubiginosana =

Scientific classification
- Domain: Eukaryota
- Kingdom: Animalia
- Phylum: Arthropoda
- Class: Insecta
- Order: Lepidoptera
- Family: Tortricidae
- Genus: Epinotia
- Species: E. rubiginosana

Binomial name
- Epinotia rubiginosana (Herrich-Schäffer, 1851)

Synonyms
- Tortrix (Steganoptycha) rubiginosana Herrich-Schaffer, 1851; Poecilochroma bouchardana Wilkinson, 1859; Retinia incognatana Peyerimhoff, 1863; Epinotia pinivora Issiki, in Issiki & Mutuura, 1961; rubiginosana Herrich-Schaffer, 1848

Species of moth

Epinotia rubiginosana is a moth of the family Tortricidae. It is found from Europe to eastern Russia, China, Korea and Japan.

The wingspan is 13–15 mm. Adults are on wing from May to July.

The larvae of the nominate subspecies feed on Pinus sylvestris, Pinus pinea and also Abies species. Subspecies koraiensis can be found on Pinus koraiensis, Pinus densiflora, Pinus strobus and Pinus pumila. The larvae feed on spun needles.

== Subspecies ==
- Epinotia rubiginosana rubiginosana (Europe)
- Epinotia rubiginosana koraiensis Falkovitsh, 1965 (eastern Asia)
