= Gynnidomorpha minimana =

Fen conch

Scientific classification
- Domain: Eukaryota
- Kingdom: Animalia
- Phylum: Arthropoda
- Class: Insecta
- Order: Lepidoptera
- Family: Tortricidae
- Genus: Gynnidomorpha
- Species: G. minimana

Binomial name
- Gynnidomorpha minimana (Caradja, 1916)

Synonyms
- Conchylis minimana Caradja, 1916

Species of moth

Gynnidomorpha minimana, the fen conch, is a moth of the family Tortricidae. The species was first described by Aristide Caradja in 1916. It is found in China (Hebei, Heilongjiang, Jianxi, Jilin, Yunnan), Taiwan, Japan, Korea, Russia and Europe, where it has been recorded from Ireland, Great Britain, the Netherlands, Italy, France, Germany, Denmark, Norway, Sweden, Finland, Estonia, Latvia, Lithuania, Slovakia, Poland, Romania, Hungary, Albania and Corsica. The habitat consists of heathland and mosses.

The wingspan is 11–15 mm. Adults are on wing from June to July.

The larvae feed on Pedicularis palustris. They feed within the flowers and seedheads of their host plant.
