= Gynnidomorpha sphaenophora =

Scientific classification
- Domain: Eukaryota
- Kingdom: Animalia
- Phylum: Arthropoda
- Class: Insecta
- Order: Lepidoptera
- Family: Tortricidae
- Genus: Gynnidomorpha
- Species: G. sphaenophora

Binomial name
- Gynnidomorpha sphaenophora (Diakonoff, 1941)

Synonyms
- Phalonia sphaenophora Diakonoff, 1941; Piercea sphaenoptera Razowski, 1992; Aethes sphenophora Diakonoff, 1948

Species of moth

Gynnidomorpha sphaenophora is a species of moth of the family Tortricidae. It is found on Java in Indonesia and Luzon in the Philippines.
