= Eulamprotes isostacta =

Scientific classification
- Kingdom: Animalia
- Phylum: Arthropoda
- Class: Insecta
- Order: Lepidoptera
- Family: Gelechiidae
- Genus: Eulamprotes
- Species: E. isostacta

Binomial name
- Eulamprotes isostacta (Meyrick, 1926)

Synonyms
- Aristotelia isostacta Meyrick, 1926

Species of moth

Eulamprotes isostacta is a moth of the family Gelechiidae. It was described by Edward Meyrick in 1926. It is found on Cyprus and in Syria.

The wingspan is about 10 mm. The forewings are dark fuscous slightly speckled with whitish. The plical and second discal stigmata are blackish and there are opposite irregular costal and dorsal whitish spots at two-thirds. There are one or two white scales at the apex. The hindwings are grey.
