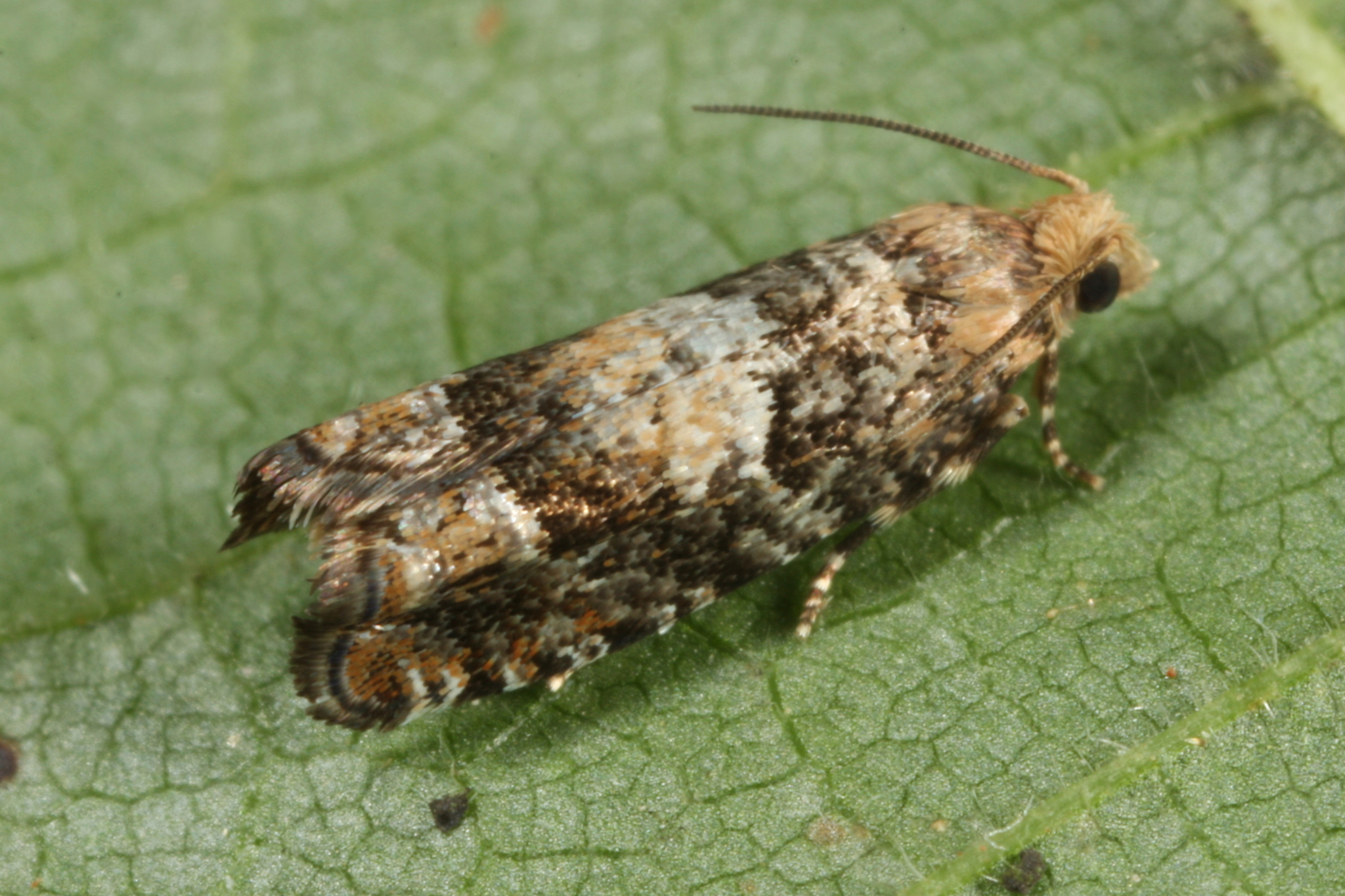

Scientific classification
- Kingdom: Animalia
- Phylum: Arthropoda
- Clade: Pancrustacea
- Class: Insecta
- Order: Lepidoptera
- Family: Tortricidae
- Genus: Epinotia
- Species: E. pusillana

Binomial name
- Epinotia pusillana (Peyerimhoff, 1863)

= Epinotia pusillana =

Species of moth

Epinotia pusillana is a moth of the family Tortricidae. It is found from France to Poland and Finland.

The wingspan is 11–13 mm. Adults are on wing in June and July in Germany and in July and August in Poland.

The larvae feed on Abies alba. They mine the needles of the host plant.
