= Eulamprotes nigromaculella =

Scientific classification
- Domain: Eukaryota
- Kingdom: Animalia
- Phylum: Arthropoda
- Class: Insecta
- Order: Lepidoptera
- Family: Gelechiidae
- Genus: Eulamprotes
- Species: E. nigromaculella

Binomial name
- Eulamprotes nigromaculella (Millière, 1872)

Synonyms
- Gelechia nigromaculella Millière, 1872; Monochroa nigromaculella; Bryotropha angustipennis Rebel, 1931; Eulamprotes donskoffi Nel & Luquet, 1997; Doryphora punctatella Staudinger, 1879; Aristotelia morphochrona Walsingham, 1900; Aristotelia jactatrix Meyrick, 1926; Aristotelia craterotypa Meyrick, 1938

Species of moth

Eulamprotes nigromaculella is a moth of the family Gelechiidae. It is found in Spain, France, Italy, Greece, Corsica, Sardinia, Sicily, Crete, Cyprus and Ukraine.

The wingspan is about 12 mm. The forewings are whitish irrorated (speckled) dark grey with a small blackish spot on the costa near the base, one at one-fifth, one on the fold slightly beyond this, and one beneath the costa at one-third. The stigmata form oval black spots, the plical very obliquely before the first discal. There is a dark grey spot on the costa at two-thirds and four small cloudy whitish spots on the costa beyond this. The hindwings are light bluish-grey.
