= Gynnidomorpha attenuata =

Scientific classification
- Kingdom: Animalia
- Phylum: Arthropoda
- Class: Insecta
- Order: Lepidoptera
- Family: Tortricidae
- Genus: Gynnidomorpha
- Species: G. attenuata

Binomial name
- Gynnidomorpha attenuata (Razowski, 1984)

Synonyms
- Phalonidia attenuata Razowski, 1984

Species of moth

Gynnidomorpha attenuata is a species of moth of the family Tortricidae. It is found in Sri Lanka.
