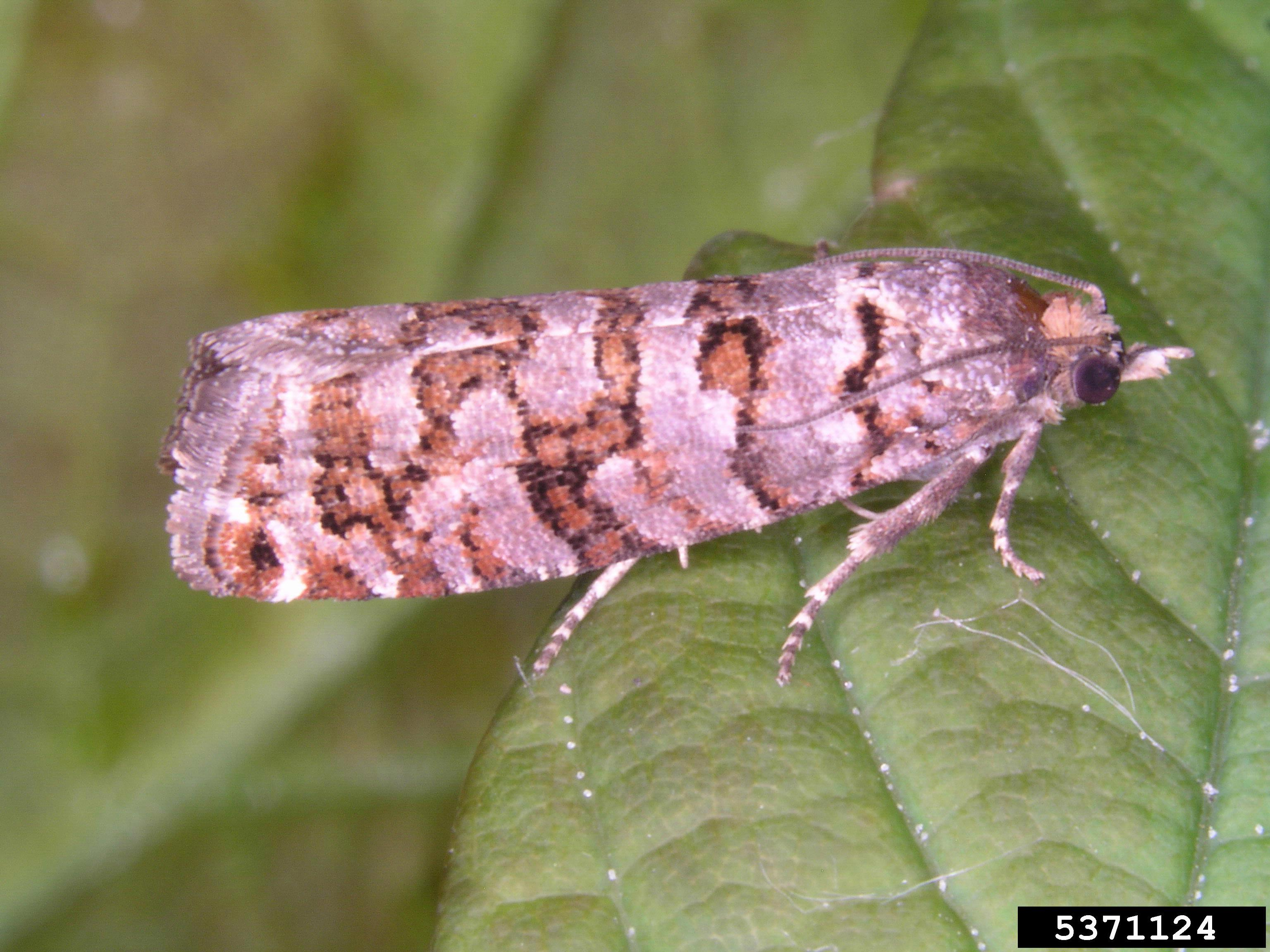
- Gravitarmata margarotana

Scientific classification
- Domain: Eukaryota
- Kingdom: Animalia
- Phylum: Arthropoda
- Class: Insecta
- Order: Lepidoptera
- Family: Tortricidae
- Tribe: Eucosmini
- Genus: Gravitarmata; Obraztsov, 1946

= Gravitarmata =

Genus of tortrix moths

Gravitarmata is a genus of moths belonging to the subfamily Olethreutinae of the family Tortricidae.

== Species ==
- Gravitarmata margarotana (Heinemann, 1863)

== See also ==
- List of Tortricidae genera
