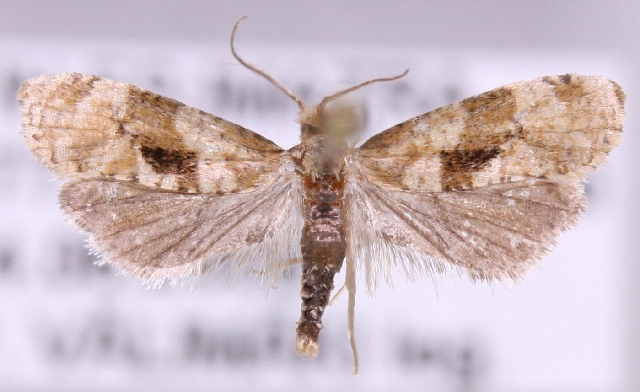

Scientific classification
- Domain: Eukaryota
- Kingdom: Animalia
- Phylum: Arthropoda
- Class: Insecta
- Order: Lepidoptera
- Family: Tortricidae
- Genus: Gynnidomorpha
- Species: G. alismana

Binomial name
- Gynnidomorpha alismana (Ragonot, 1883)

Synonyms
- Conchylis alismana Ragonot, 1883

= Gynnidomorpha alismana =

Water plantain conch

Species of moth

Gynnidomorpha alismana, the water plantain conch, is a moth of the family Tortricidae. It was described by Ragonot in 1883. It is found in most of Europe, except Spain, Switzerland, most of the Balkan Peninsula and Ukraine. Further east it is found across the Palearctic to China (Anhui, Fujian, Guangdong, Guizhou, Hebei, Heilongjiang, Hubei, Hunan, Inner Mongolia, Jiangxi, Jilin, Shaanxi, Yunnan) and Korea. It is found in riverine and other watery habitats.

The wingspan is 11–14 mm. The head is pale ochreous. Forewings with a gently arched costa .They are pale ochreous, submetallic, the margins more or less strigulated with dark fuscous > There is an ochreous-brownish basal patch, often represented by an angulated edge only.Then a slightly curved ochreous-brown median fascia, suffused with blackish below middle. There are some ochreous brownish clouds towards the tornus. An ochreous-brown fascia from costa posteriorly is obsolete before termen. The hindwings are grey, almost black. The larva is dull yellowish -pink or pinkish-brown; head and plate of 2 black-brown :

Adults are on wing from June to August.
