= Stenoptilia lutescens =

Scientific classification
- Kingdom: Animalia
- Phylum: Arthropoda
- Clade: Pancrustacea
- Class: Insecta
- Order: Lepidoptera
- Family: Pterophoridae
- Genus: Stenoptilia
- Species: S. lutescens

Binomial name
- Stenoptilia lutescens (Herrich-Schaffer, 1855)

Synonyms
- Pterophorus lutescens Herrich-Schäffer, 1855; Mimaesoptilus arvernicus Peyerimhoff, 1875; Stenoptilia grandis Chapman, 1908

Species of plume moth

Stenoptilia lutescens is a moth of the family Pterophoridae. It is found in Spain, France, Switzerland, Italy, Serbia and Montenegro, Albania, and North Macedonia, and on the island of Sardinia.

The length of the forewings is 9–11 mm. Adults are on wing in May.

The larvae feed on Gentiana lutea.
