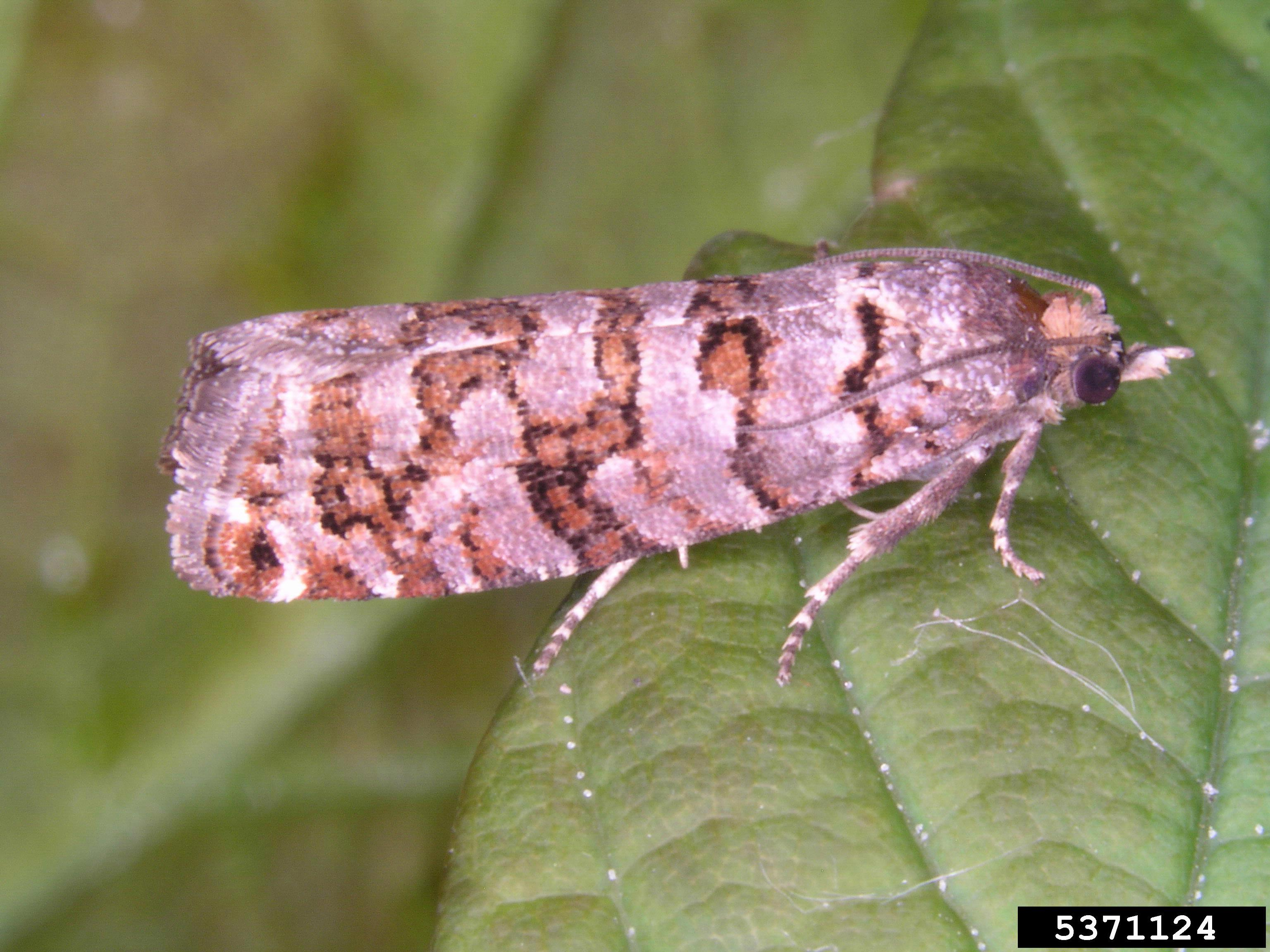

Scientific classification
- Kingdom: Animalia
- Phylum: Arthropoda
- Clade: Pancrustacea
- Class: Insecta
- Order: Lepidoptera
- Family: Tortricidae
- Genus: Gravitarmata
- Species: G. margarotana

Binomial name
- Gravitarmata margarotana (von Heinemann, 1863)

Synonyms
- Retinia margarotana Heinemann, 1863; Retinia amethystana Peyerimhoff, 1872; Retinia retiferana Wocke, 1879

= Gravitarmata margarotana =

Species of moth

Gravitarmata margarotana, the pine cone tortrix or pine twig moth, is a moth of the family Tortricidae. In Europe, it is found from England to Austria and Poland, east to the Baltic region to Russia, China (Shanxi, Liaoning, Heilongjiang, Jiangsu, Zhejiang, Anhui, Jiangxi, Shandong, Henan, Hubei, Hunan, Guangdong, Guangxi, Sichuan, Yunnan, Guizhou, Shaanxi, Gansu), Korea and Japan.

The wingspan is 14–18 mm. Adults are on wing from April to May in Europe. There is one generation per year.

The larvae feed on Pinus, Abies and possibly also on Picea species. It feeds in twigs and cones of the food plants.
