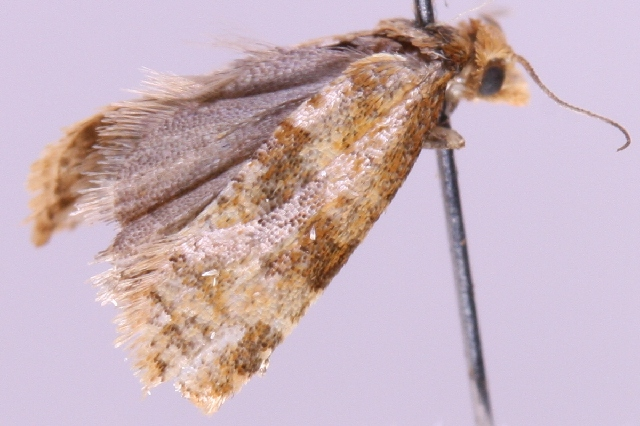

Scientific classification
- Kingdom: Animalia
- Phylum: Arthropoda
- Class: Insecta
- Order: Lepidoptera
- Family: Tortricidae
- Genus: Gynnidomorpha
- Species: G. vectisana

Binomial name
- Gynnidomorpha vectisana (Humphreys & Westwood, 1845)

Synonyms
- Cochylis vectisana Humphreys & Westwood, 1845; Tortrix (Cochylis) geyeriana Herrich-Schaffer, 1851; Tortrix geyeriana Herrich-Schaffer, 1847; Eupoecilia griceana Wood, 1836; Tortrix griseana Haworth, [1811]; Tortrix grisescens Durrant & de Joannis, 1922; Eupoecilia veitisana Westwood, in Wood, 1854

= Gynnidomorpha vectisana =

Small saltern conch

Species of moth

Gynnidomorpha vectisana, the small saltern conch, is a moth of the family Tortricidae. It was described by Henry Noel Humphreys and John O. Westwood in 1845. It is found in China (Henan, Jiangxi, Jilin, Xinjiang), Japan, Korea, Ireland, Great Britain, Scandinavia, the Benelux, Germany, the Czech Republic, Slovakia, Hungary, Romania, Switzerland, Austria, Italy, Spain, the Baltic region and Russia. The habitat consists of saltmarshes, fens, wet heathland and freshwater marshes.

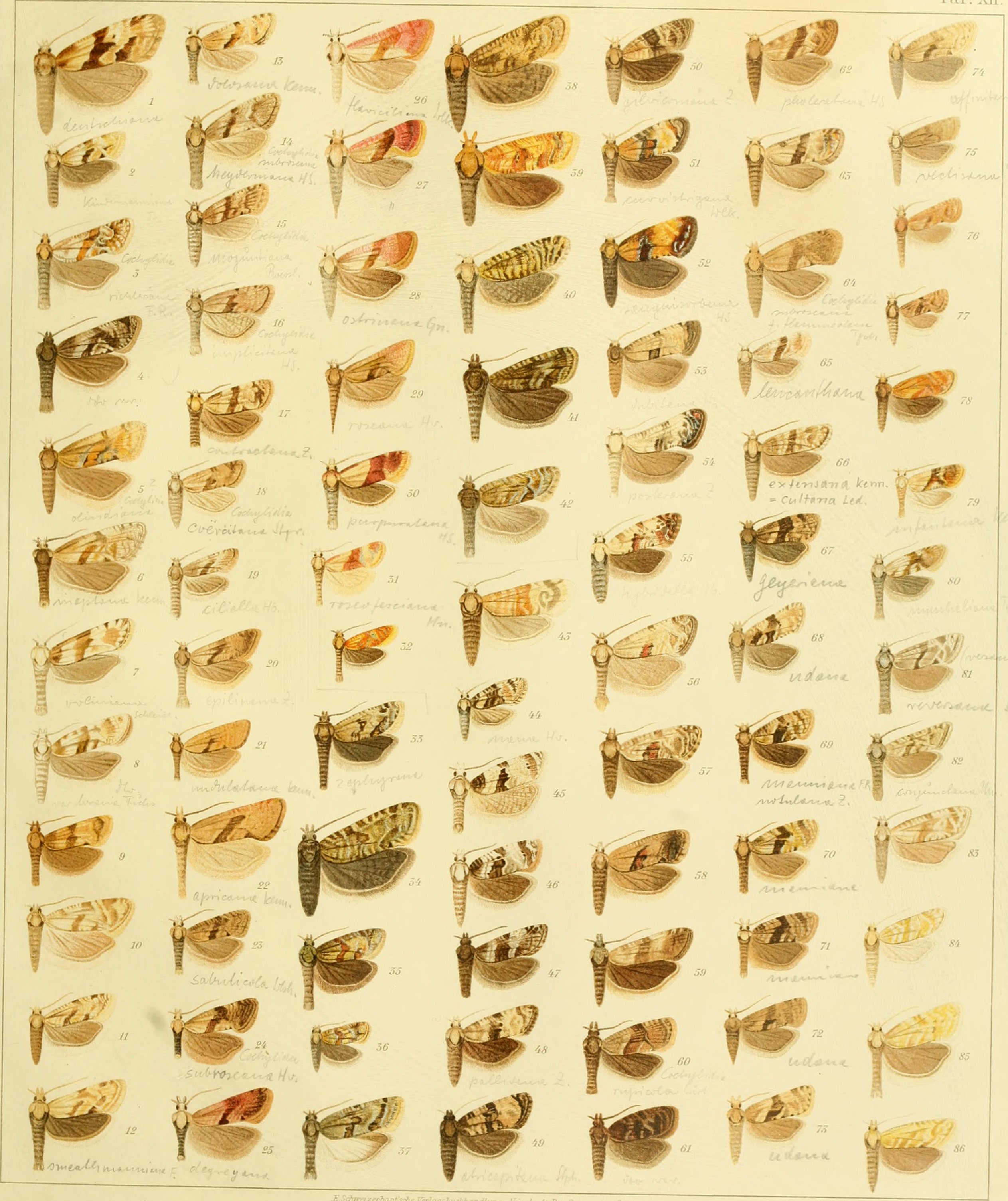
Gynnidomorpha vectisana figure 75 and related species

The wingspan is 9–12 mm. The forewings are elongate, with a gently arched costa.The ground colour is brownish-ochreous, sprinkled with dark fuscous, towards termen and on dorsum strigulated with dark fuscous. There is a narrow obscure rather dark fuscous median fascia, somewhat angulated and interrupted near costa, connected in the middle with the tornus by an oblique dark suffusion.Also there is a fuscous spot on the costa towards the apex. The hindwings are rather dark grey.

Adults are on wing from late May to June and again from July to September in two generations per year.

The larvae feed on Plantago maritima, Triglochin palustris and Salicornia species. First generation larvae feed on the flowerheads, while the second generation feeds on the shoots and rootstock.
