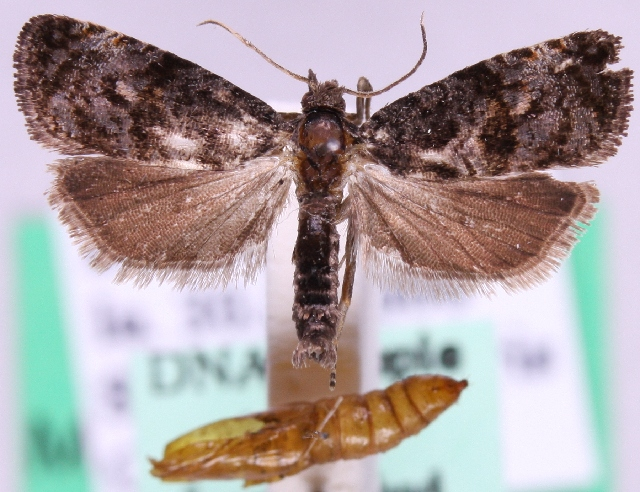

Scientific classification
- Kingdom: Animalia
- Phylum: Arthropoda
- Clade: Pancrustacea
- Class: Insecta
- Order: Lepidoptera
- Family: Tortricidae
- Genus: Endothenia
- Species: E. pullana

Binomial name
- Endothenia pullana (Haworth, 1811)

Synonyms
- Tortrix pullana Haworth, [1811]; Sideria violana Peyerimhoff, 1863

= Endothenia pullana =

Species of moth

Endothenia pullana, the woundwort marble, is a moth of the family Tortricidae. It was described by Adrian Hardy Haworth in 1811. It is found in north-western Europe, Sweden, Finland, Austria, Slovakia, Ukraine, Belarus and Russia. The habitat consists of marshy areas.

The wingspan is 10–14 mm. Adults are on wing from late May to July.

The larvae feed on Stachys palustris.
