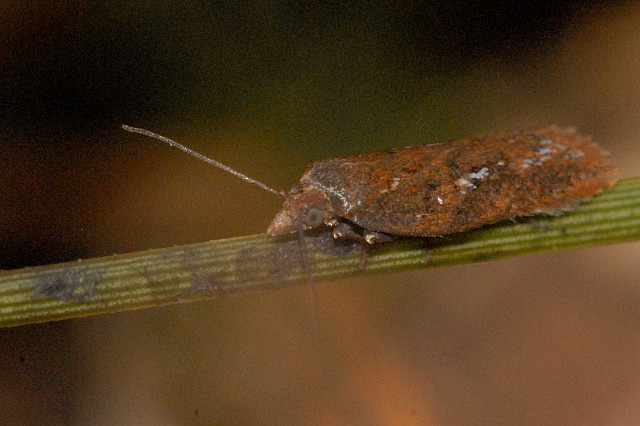
- Acleris hyemana Ardennes
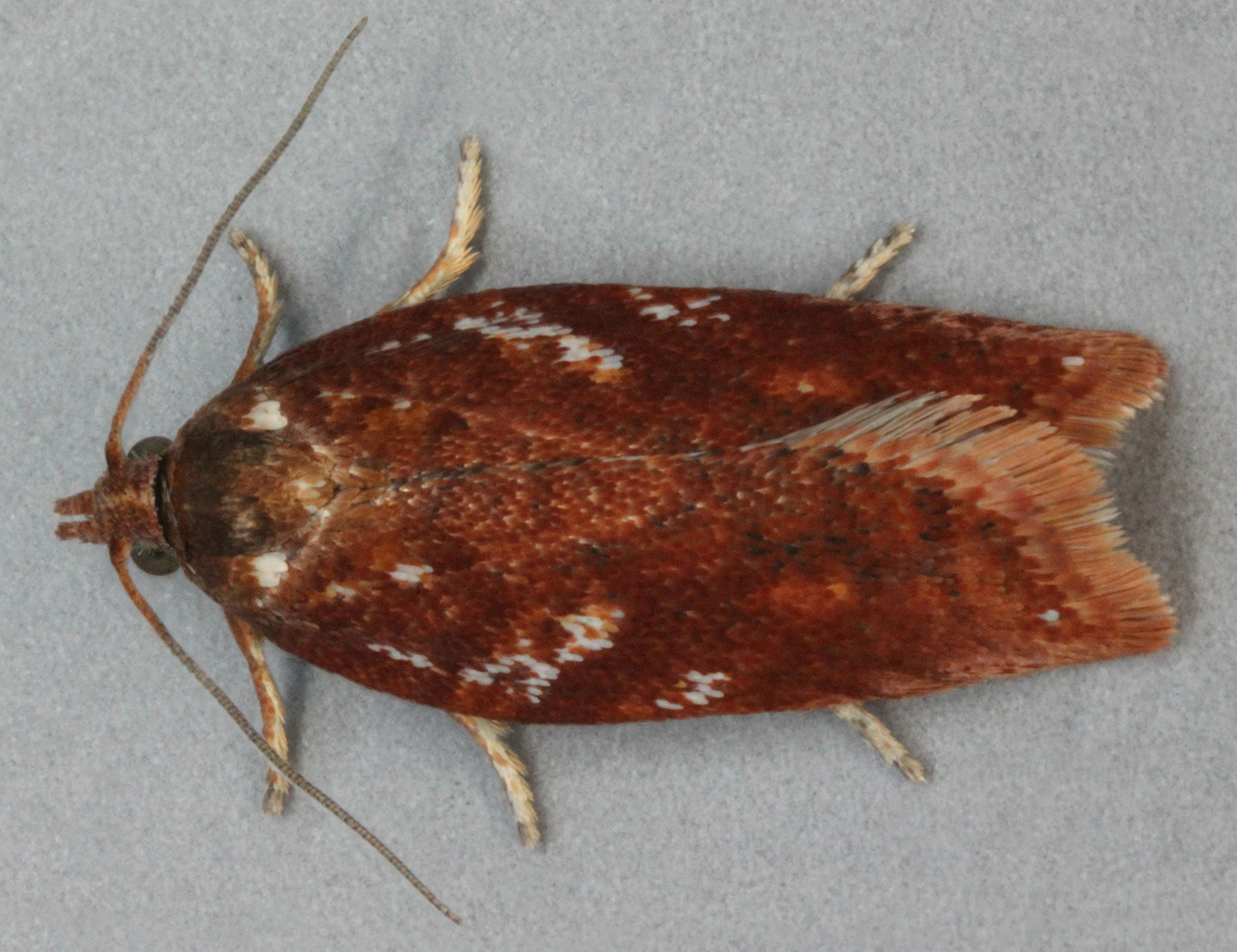
- Acleris hyemana, North Wales

Scientific classification
- Kingdom: Animalia
- Phylum: Arthropoda
- Clade: Pancrustacea
- Class: Insecta
- Order: Lepidoptera
- Family: Tortricidae
- Genus: Acleris
- Species: A. hyemana

Binomial name
- Acleris hyemana (Haworth, 1811)

Synonyms
- Tortrix hyemana Haworth, [1811]; Tortrix mixtana Hübner, [1813]; Teras mixtana var. provinciana Peyerimhoff, 1872; Peronea hyemana f. griseana Sheldon, 1930; Peronea hyemana f. brunneana Sheldon, 1930; Acalla mixtana Kennel, 1908; Acleris mixtana Obraztsov, 1956

= Acleris hyemana =

Species of moth

Acleris hyemana is a moth of the family Tortricidae. It is found in Europe.

The wingspan is 14–20 mm (0.55–0.79 in).The forewings are rather narrowed anteriorly, grey-whitish, irregularly and variably mixed with red-brown; tufts very slight; central fascia (often’ interrupted or incomplete) and costal patch usually red-brown; often some small scattered blackish spots. The hindwings are grey. The larva is yellow-green; the dorsal line darker; head yellowish-brown.

Adults are on wing from August to May. There is one generation per year.

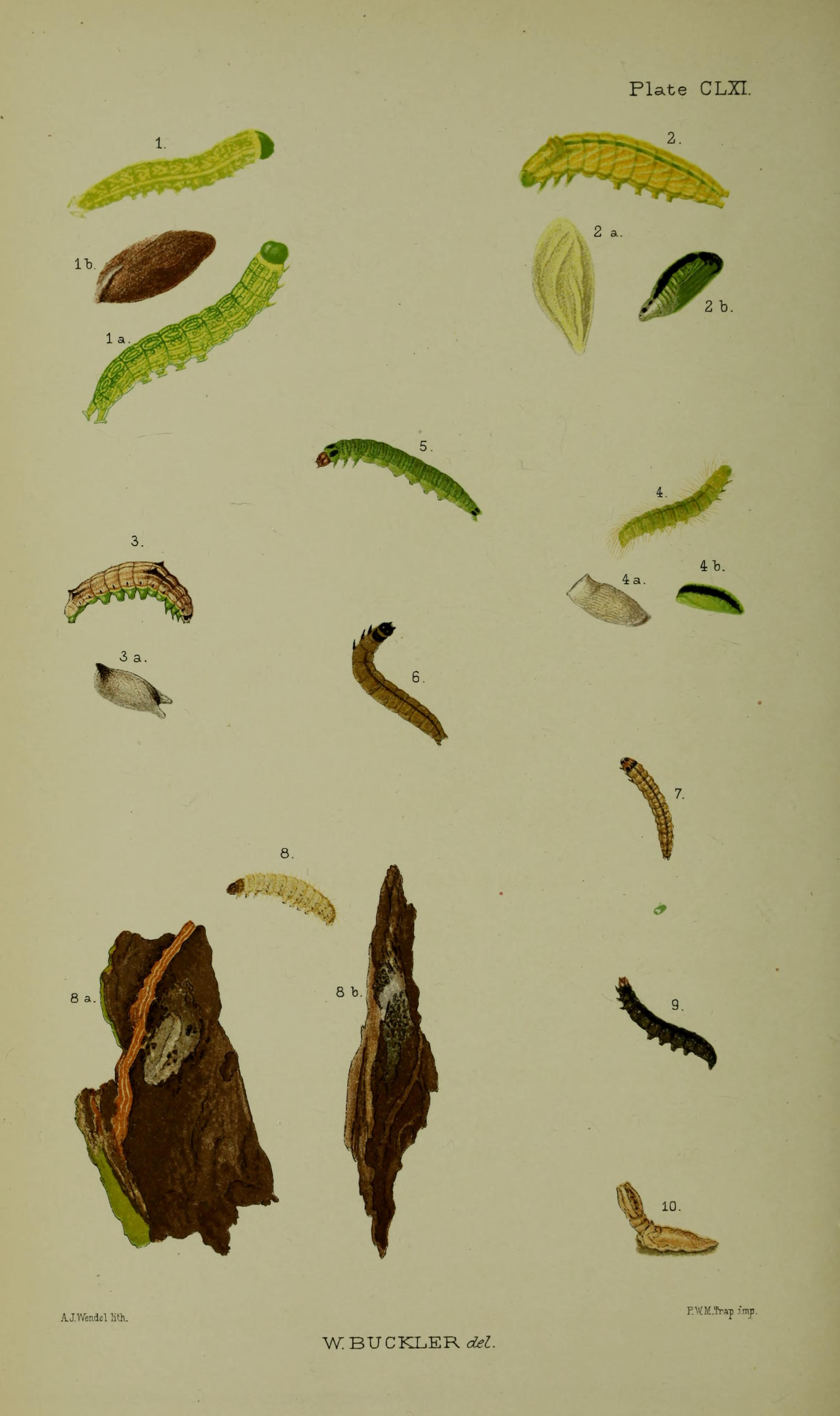
Fig. 10 pupa case and cocoon

The larvae feed on Ericaceae species, mainly Erica, Calluna vulgaris and Vaccinium.
