= Phyllonorycter cerisolella =

Scientific classification
- Domain: Eukaryota
- Kingdom: Animalia
- Phylum: Arthropoda
- Class: Insecta
- Order: Lepidoptera
- Family: Gracillariidae
- Genus: Phyllonorycter
- Species: P. cerisolella

Binomial name
- Phyllonorycter cerisolella (Peyerimhoff, 1872)

Synonyms
- Lithocolletis cerisolella Peyerimhoff, 1872

Species of moth

Phyllonorycter cerisolella is a moth of the family Gracillariidae. It is known from France.

The larvae feed on Sorbus species. They mine the leaves of their host plant.
