= Henri de Peyerimhoff (entomologist) =

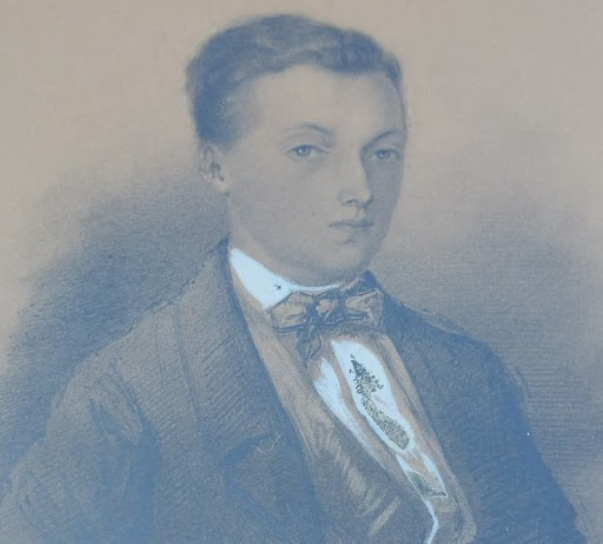
- Born: 27 July 1838; Colmar, Alsace, France
- Died: 9 April 1877 (aged 38); Perpignan, France
- Occupations: Magistrate, entomologist

Henri de Peyerimhoff de Fontenelle full name Marie Antoine Hercule Henri de Peyerimhoff (27 July 1838 – 9 April 1877) was a magistrate and entomologist from Alsace, France. He is known for his work with smaller moths.

== Life ==
Henri de Peyerimhoff de Fontenelle was born on 27 July 1838 in Colmar, Alsace. His parents were Jean-Baptiste Hercule de Peyerimhoff de Fontenelle (1809–1890), mayor of Colmar, and Marie-Rose Béchelé. His father's family originated in 14th-century Alsace near the borders with Bavaria and Baden. The Catholic branch associated with Switzerland assumed the name "Peyerimhoff de Fontenelle" in the late 18th century. His father was head of the Colmar municipal council and did much to modernise the city. Henri de Peyerimhoff became a magistrate and was also an entomologist who specialized in microlepidoptera (smaller moths).

Peyerimhoff married Marie George on 15 November 1870 in Strasbourg. She was from the Bellaigues, a solid bourgeoisie de robe in Nancy. When Alsace became part of Germany after the Franco-Prussian War of 1870, Peyerimhoff chose to remain French and became judge of the civil court of Moulins in 1873, and then of Perpignan. His father remained in Colmar and became a deputy in the Landesausschuss, the state legislature. Peyerimhoff suffered from poor health. He died on 9 April 1877 in Perpignan at the age of 38.

Peyerimhoff left two sons, Henri de Peyerimhoff (1871–1953), who became a civil servant and businessman, and Paul de Peyerimhoff de Fontenelle (1873–1957), who joined the Forestry service and became an entomologist. In his obituary of Peyerimhoff the Abbé Umhang wrote, "I have known more than one young man who has been passionate about a branch of natural history, and I have not seen any of them depart from the path of virtue and honor." The preliminary results of his extensive studies of the Tortricidae of moths were published in the Annales de la Société Entomologique de France in 1876, but were incomplete at the time of his death.

== Publications ==
Publications by Henri de Peyerimhoff included:

- Peyerimhoff, Henri de (1859), De domicilio. -Du domicile. - De l'acceptation par intervention de la lettre de change (Th. licence : Droit), Strasbourg
- Peyerimhoff, Henri de (1862), Catalogue des lépidoptères d'Alsace, avec indication des localités, de l'époque d'apparition et de quelques détails propres à en faciliter la recherche (in French), Colmar: Impr. et lithog. de C. Decker

== Species named by Peyerimhoff ==
Name	Family	Year	Synonym of	Notes
Aethes deaurana	Tortricidae	1877		Also named Cochylis deaurana by Peyerimhoff in 1877
Argyresthia chrysidella	Yponomeutidae	1877		
Aristotelia lucentella	Gelechiidae	1871	Eulamprotes unicolorella	Commonly called "unmarked neb"
Chauliodus daucellus	Epermeniidae	1870	Epermenia aequidentellus	
Cochylis millierana	Tortricidae	1877	Cochylis salebrana	
Cochylis rubricana	Tortricidae	1877	Gynnidomorpha rubricana	
Crinopteryx familiella	Incurvariidae	1871		Sole species in the genus Crinopteryx and subfamily Crinopteryginae
Ephippiphora rectana	Tortricidae	1863	Epinotia brunnichana	
Epinotia pusillana	Tortricidae	1863		
Eucosma mirificana	Tortricidae	1877		
Gelechia horticolla	Gelechiidae	1871	Caryocolum proxima	
Gelechia squamulella	Gelechiidae	1871	Xenolechia aethiops	Also named Teleiodes squamulella by Peyerimhoff in 1871
Gelechia superfetella	Gelechiidae	1877	Athrips rancidella	Commonly called "cotoneaster webworm"
Grapholitha pflugiana var. alsaticana	Tortricidae	1872	Epiblema scutulana	
Gynnidomorpha rubricana	Tortricidae	1877		
Lithocolletis cerisolella	Gracillariidae	1872	Phyllonorycter cerisolella	
Mecyna auralis	Crambidae	1872		Also named Botys auralis by Peyerimhoff in 1872
Mimaesoptilus arvernicus	Pterophoridae	1875	Stenoptilia lutescens	
Nemophora pseudopilella	Adelidae	1877	Nematopogon adansoniella	
Nemophora reaumurella	Adelidae	1870	Nematopogon swammerdamella	
Nepticula ilicivora	Nepticulidae	1871	Stigmella suberivora	
Orthotaenia obesana	Tortricidae	1863	Endothenia quadrimaculana	
Pammene giganteana	Tortricidae	1863		
Parafomoria cistivora	Nepticulidae	1871		Also named Nepticula cistivora by Peyerimhoff in 1871
Phoxopteris castaneana	Tortricidae	1863	Ancylis upupana	
Retinia amethystana	Tortricidae	1872	Gravitarmata margarotana	
Retinia incognatana	Tortricidae	1863	Epinotia rubiginosana	
Scoparia gallica	Crambidae	1873		
Sideria violana	Tortricidae	1863	Endothenia pullana	Commonly called "woundwort marble"
Teras cyaneana	Tortricidae	1872	Acleris caucasica	
Teras mixtana var. provinciana	Tortricidae	1872	Acleris hyemana	
Teras mucidana	Tortricidae	1873	Acleris quercinana	
Tortrix culmana	Tortricidae	1863	Clepsis senecionana	

== Sources ==
- Chambon, Jean-Pierre (1999), Atlas des genitalia mâles des lépidoptères Tortricidae de France et Belgique (in French), Editions Quae, ISBN 978-2-7380-0850-3
- Chatriot, Alain, "Henri de Peyerimhoff, figure du syndicalisme patronal de l'industrie houillère", Annales des Mines (in French)
- Goss, H. (1877), "Societies", The Entomologist, London: Simpkin, Marshall & Co for British Trust for Entomology; Royal Entomological Society of London
- Henri de Peyerimhoff (1838-1877) (in French), BnF: Bibliotheque nationale de France
- "Pammene giganteana", UKMoths
- Pierfit, "Henri de PEYERIMHOFF de FONTENELLE", geneanet (in French)
- Walsingham (8 December 1882), "Review: Catalogue of the Tortricidae of North America North of Mexico by Professor C.H. Fernald", The Entomologist's Monthly Magazine
