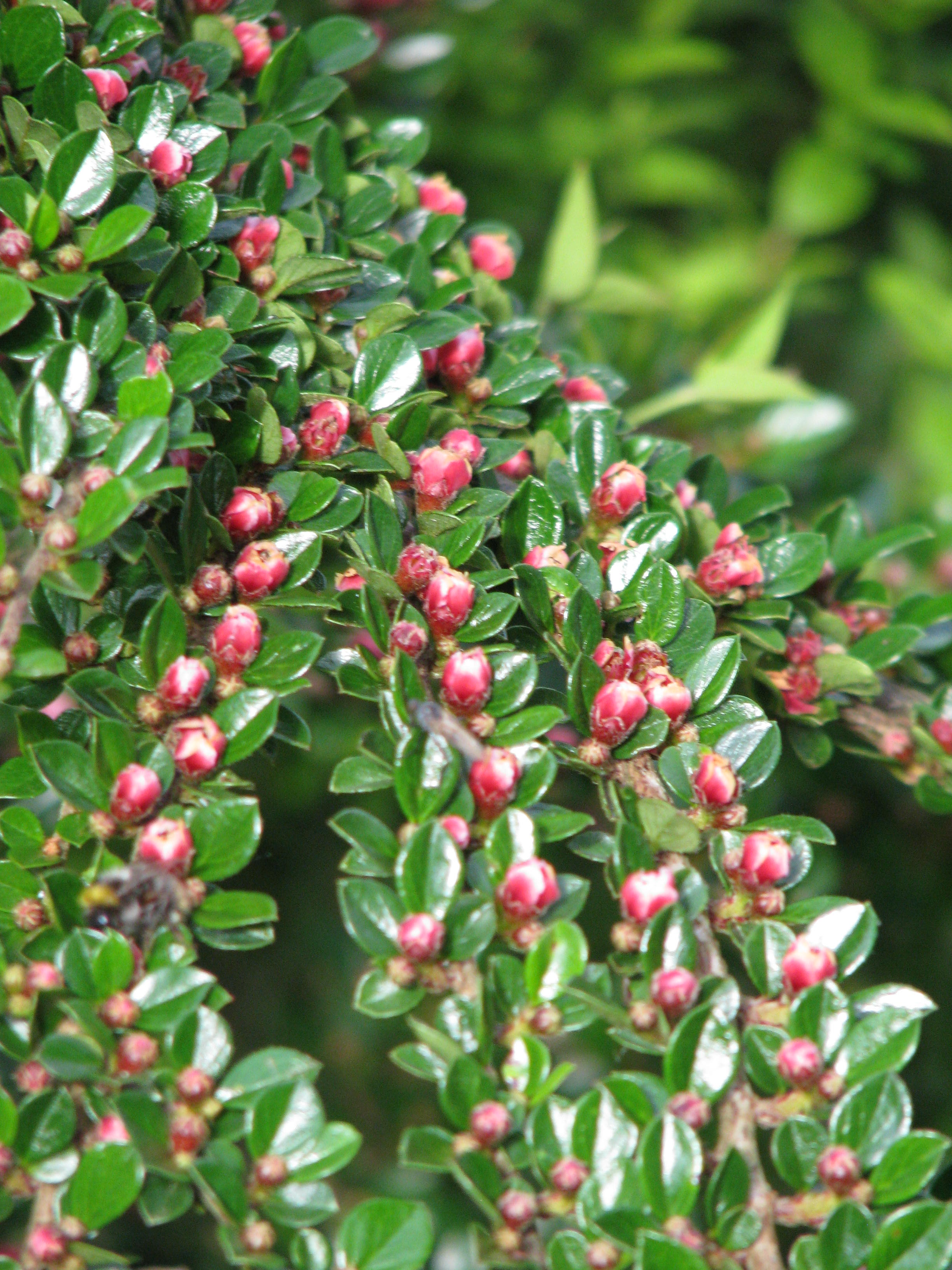

Scientific classification
- Kingdom: Plantae
- Clade: Tracheophytes
- Clade: Angiosperms
- Clade: Eudicots
- Clade: Rosids
- Order: Rosales
- Family: Rosaceae
- Genus: Cotoneaster
- Species: C. horizontalis

Binomial name
- Cotoneaster horizontalis Decne.

Synonyms
- Diospyros chaffanjonii H.Lév. Cotoneaster acuminatus prostratus Hook.f. ex Wenz. Cotoneaster acuminatus var. prostratus Hook. ex Decne. Cotoneaster atropurpureus Flinck & B.Hylmö; Cotoneaster atrovirens J.Fryer & B.Hylmö; Cotoneaster davidianus Dippel; Cotoneaster horizontalis var. perpusillus C.K.Schneid. Cotoneaster horizontalis f. variegatus (Osborn) Rehder; Cotoneaster horizontalis var. variegatus Osborn; Cotoneaster microphyllus Diels; Pyrus atroramosa M.F.Fay & Christenh.

= Cotoneaster horizontalis =

Species of flowering plant

Cotoneaster horizontalis is a species of flowering plant in the genus Cotoneaster of the family Rosaceae.

== Description ==
Cotoneaster horizontalis is a short shrub with a spreading habit, growing to 1 metre (3 ft 3 in) tall by 1.5 metres (4 ft 11 in) wide. It is cultivated for its flat, symmetrical sprays of glossy green, deciduous leaves 6 to 12 mm long. The flowers appear in summer, and can range from pink to white. It is commonly grown in parks and gardens in temperate regions as hedging or groundcover.

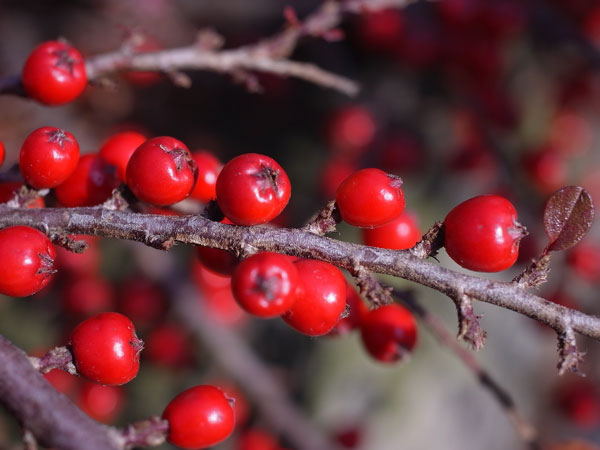
Fruits

== Distribution ==
Cotoneaster horizontalis is native to mountains of Nepal, China, and Taiwan; in China it occurs from Tibet and Yunnan in the west to Jiangsu and Zhejiang in the east and is absent from the north and the very south. It has naturalised in parts of the United Kingdom, and may be becoming invasive. It has been recorded from Counties Down, Antrim and Dublin in Ireland.

This plant has gained the Royal Horticultural Society's Award of Garden Merit.
