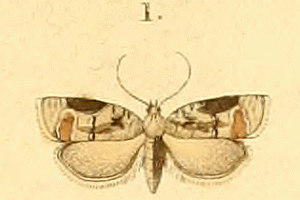

Scientific classification
- Domain: Eukaryota
- Kingdom: Animalia
- Phylum: Arthropoda
- Class: Insecta
- Order: Lepidoptera
- Family: Tortricidae
- Genus: Acleris
- Species: A. lacordairana

Binomial name
- Acleris lacordairana (Duponchel, 1836)

Synonyms
- Peronea lacordairana Duponchel, 1836

= Acleris lacordairana =

Species of moth

Acleris lacordairana is a species of moth of the family Tortricidae. It is found in Germany, Austria, Switzerland, Italy, Hungary, Poland, Estonia, Latvia and Russia. In the east, the range extends to Japan.

The wingspan is 16–18 mm. Adults are on wing from June to September.

The larvae feed on Ulmus and Salix species.
