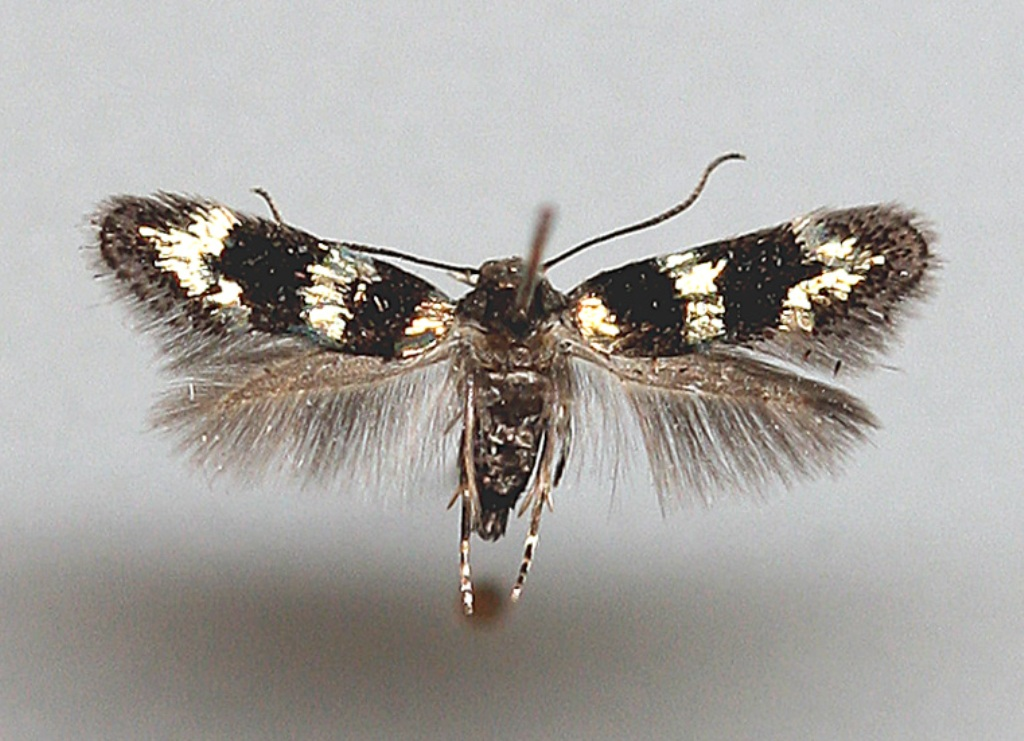
- Female
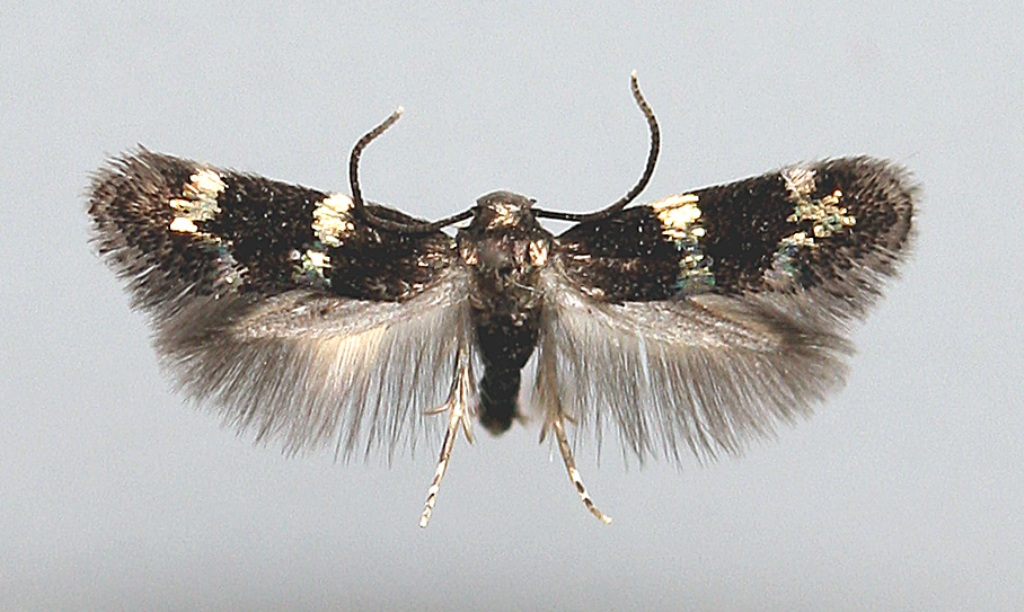
- Male

Scientific classification
- Domain: Eukaryota
- Kingdom: Animalia
- Phylum: Arthropoda
- Class: Insecta
- Order: Lepidoptera
- Family: Elachistidae
- Genus: Elachista
- Species: E. gleichenella

Binomial name
- Elachista gleichenella (Fabricius, 1781)

Synonyms
- List: Tinea gleichella Fabricius, 1794; Oecophora magnificella Duponchel, [1843] 1842; Elachista trifasciella Nylander, [1848] 1847; Poeciloptilia fractella Herrich-Schäffer, 1855

= Elachista gleichenella =

Species of moth

Elachista gleichenella is a moth of the family Elachistidae found in most of Europe.

== Description ==
The wingspan is 8–9 mm (0.31–0.35 in).The head is bronzy -metallic. Forewings are dark bronzy -fuscous; a small basal spot, a fascia before middle, and an outwards -angulated fascia towards apex pale golden-metallic. Hindwings are grey. The Larva is whitish, faintly purple-tinged; head dark brown; 2 with two purple-blackish marks.

== Biology ==
The larvae feed on Carex curvula, Carex digitata, Carex divulsa, star sedge (Carex echinata), glaucous sedge (Carex flacca), dwarf sedge (Carex humilis), smooth-stalked sedge (Carex laevigata), soft-leaved sedge (Carex montana), Carex morrowii, Carex muricata, Carex ornithopoda, false fox-sedge (Carex otrubae), greater tussock-sedge (Carex paniculata), pendulous sedge (Carex pendula), Carex pilosa, Carex sempervirens, wood sedge {Carex sylvatica}, Carex umbrosa, tufted hairgrass (Deschampsia cespitosa), white wood-rush (Luzula luzuloides), hairy wood-rush (Luzula pilosa), Luzula plumose and greater wood-rush (Luzula sylvatica).

== Distribution ==
The moth is found in most of Europe (except the Iberian Peninsula), east into northern Russia.
