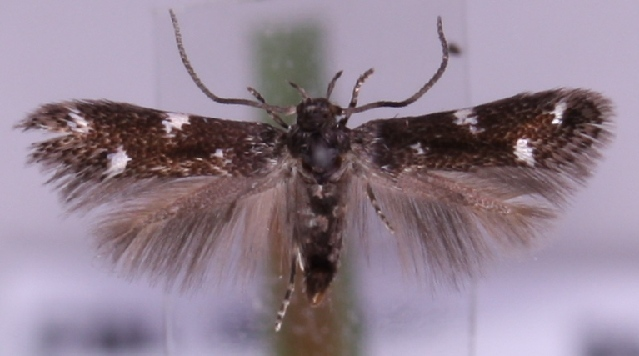

Scientific classification
- Kingdom: Animalia
- Phylum: Arthropoda
- Class: Insecta
- Order: Lepidoptera
- Family: Elachistidae
- Genus: Elachista
- Species: E. ornithopodella

Binomial name
- Elachista ornithopodella Frey, 1859

= Elachista ornithopodella =

Species of moth

Elachista ornithopodella is a moth of the family Elachistidae. It is found from Finland to northern Italy and from Germany to Romania.

The larvae feed on Carex montana, Carex ornithopoda and Carex sempervirens. They mine the leaves of their host plant.
