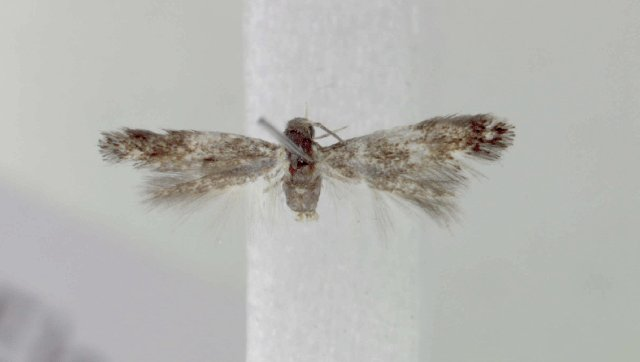

Scientific classification
- Domain: Eukaryota
- Kingdom: Animalia
- Phylum: Arthropoda
- Class: Insecta
- Order: Lepidoptera
- Family: Elachistidae
- Genus: Elachista
- Species: E. cinereopunctella

Binomial name
- Elachista cinereopunctella (Haworth, 1828)

Synonyms
- List: Tinea cinereopunctella Haworth, 1828; Biselachista cinereopunctella

= Elachista cinereopunctella =

Species of moth

Elachista cinereopunctella is a moth of the family Elachistidae found in Europe.

== Description ==
The wingspan is 7–9 millimetres (0.28–0.35 in) The head is grey, face white. Forewings are grey, irrorated with dark fuscous; a central fascia not reaching dorsum, a spot on tornus, and another on costa close before apex whitish; a black apical dot. Hindwings are dark grey. The larva is whitish, sides more yellowish; subdorsal series of red spots; head dark brown; 2 with two brown spots.

The larvae feed on Carex digitata, rare spring sedge (Carex ericetorum), glaucous sedge (Carex flacca), dwarf sedge (Carex humilis), Carex ornithopoda, Carex pilosa, tufted hairgrass (Deschampsia cespitosa), melic grass (Melica species) and blue moor-grass (Sesleria caerulea). They mine the leaves of their host plant. Larvae can be found from late summer to the following spring. The species overwinters within the mine.

== Distribution ==
It is found from Scandinavia and Russia to the Iberian Peninsula and Italy and from Ireland to Poland.
