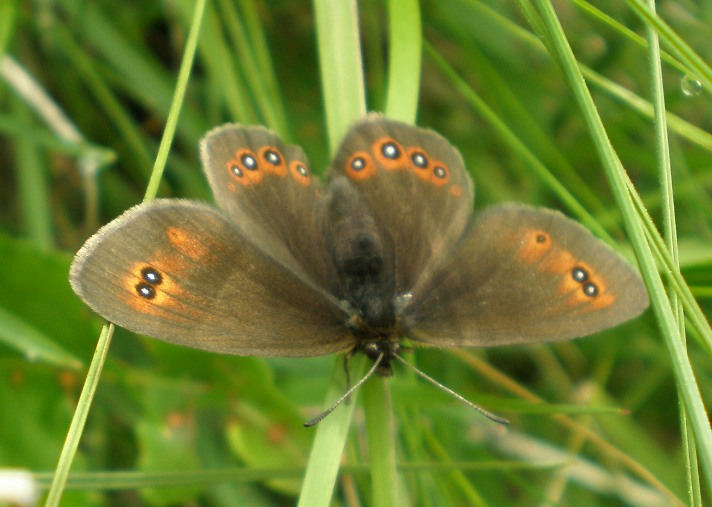

Scientific classification
- Kingdom: Animalia
- Phylum: Arthropoda
- Class: Insecta
- Order: Lepidoptera
- Family: Nymphalidae
- Genus: Erebia
- Species: E. oeme

Binomial name
- Erebia oeme (Hübner ,1804)

= Bright eyed ringlet =

Species of butterfly

The bright eyed ringlet (Erebia oeme) is a member of the Satyridae subfamily of Nymphalidae. It is a high mountain butterfly found in the Pyrenees, Massif Central, Alps and Balkan mountains. It has recently been confirmed to occur in the southern chain of the Carpathians.

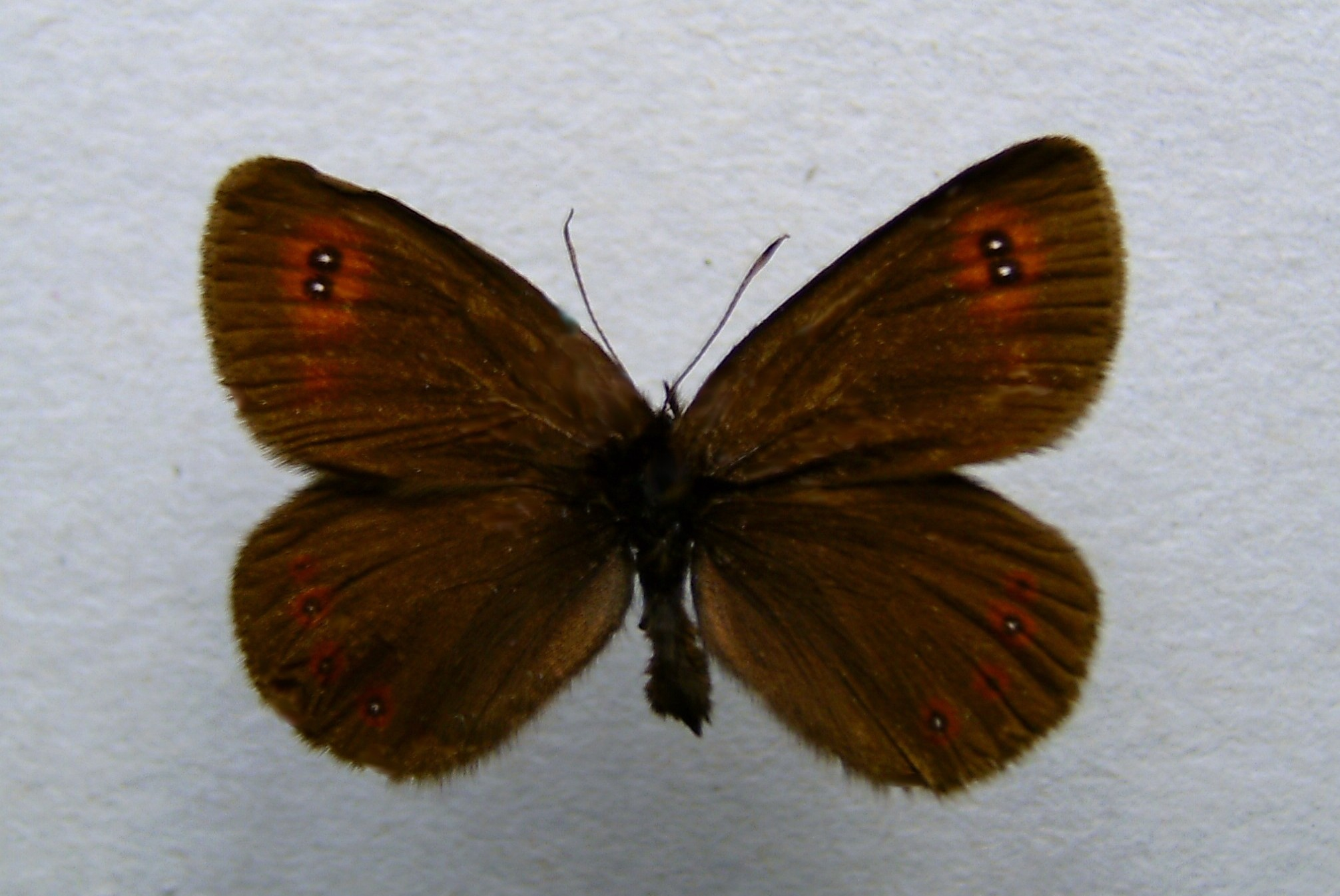

The length of the forewings is 28–36 mm.

== Description in Seitz ==
E. oeme Hbn. (35 g). Variable in size, usually somewhat smaller than medusa, the wings more elongate. On the forewing there is near the apex a russet -yellow, sometimes divided spot which bears two white-centred black ocelli. The hindwing has distally 2-4 white-centred ocelli which are edged with russet -yellow. Underside grey-brown, markings as above. The female, which is usually somewhat larger, is lighter, the ocelli being larger and more prominent than in the male; the hindwing beneath yellowish grey. Widely distributed over the Alps, but sporadic, occurring especially on limestone, being usually not rare on the flight-places. — ab. lugens Stgr. is a smaller form in which the forewing is uniformly black-brown above; on the underside the ocelli below the costa are always separated. In the Gadmen Valley in Western Switzerland. — spodia Stgr. (35 g) is mostly somewhat larger than oeme, the fore- and hindwings have a complete distal band, the ocelli are larger and conspicuously centred with white. Transitions towards nametypical oeme are not rare. This is the form of the Eastern Alps and the Balcan. — Egg (of the form spodia) round, glabrous, glossy white. Larva similar to the larva of medusa in shape and markings, not being green however, but pale clayish, with brownish longitudinal lines; each ring is crossed by a transverse line composed of 4 black united spots; above the legs a chocolate-brown side-stripe. On Luzula-species. Pupa pale yellow, the sheaths of the eyes, tongue and wings edged with brown (Rogenhofer). The butterfly in June and July.

Adults are on wing from June to August in one generation.

The larvae feed on various grasses, including Poa alpina, Poa pratensis, Poa nemoralis, Festuca rubra, Carex flacca, Carex sempervirens, Briza media and Molinia caerulea.
