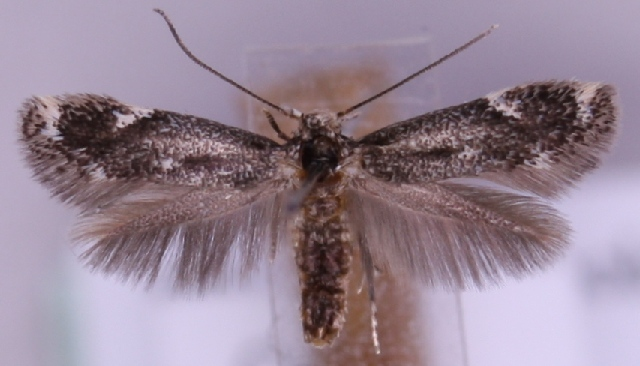

Scientific classification
- Kingdom: Animalia
- Phylum: Arthropoda
- Class: Insecta
- Order: Lepidoptera
- Family: Elachistidae
- Genus: Elachista
- Species: E. occidentalis

Binomial name
- Elachista occidentalis Frey, 1882

Synonyms
- Biselachista buvati Traugott-Olsen, 1994; Biselachista ruthae Traugott-Olsen, 1994

= Elachista occidentalis =

Species of moth

Elachista occidentalis is a moth of the family Elachistidae. It is found from Fennoscandia to the Pyrenees, Italy and Greece and from Ireland to Poland.

Elachista occidentalis is part of the Elachista juliensis species complex and can only be identified by dissection and a microscopy preparation.

There is one generation per year.

The larvae feed on Carex digitata and Carex ericetorum. They mine the leaves of their host plant. They are greyish green.
