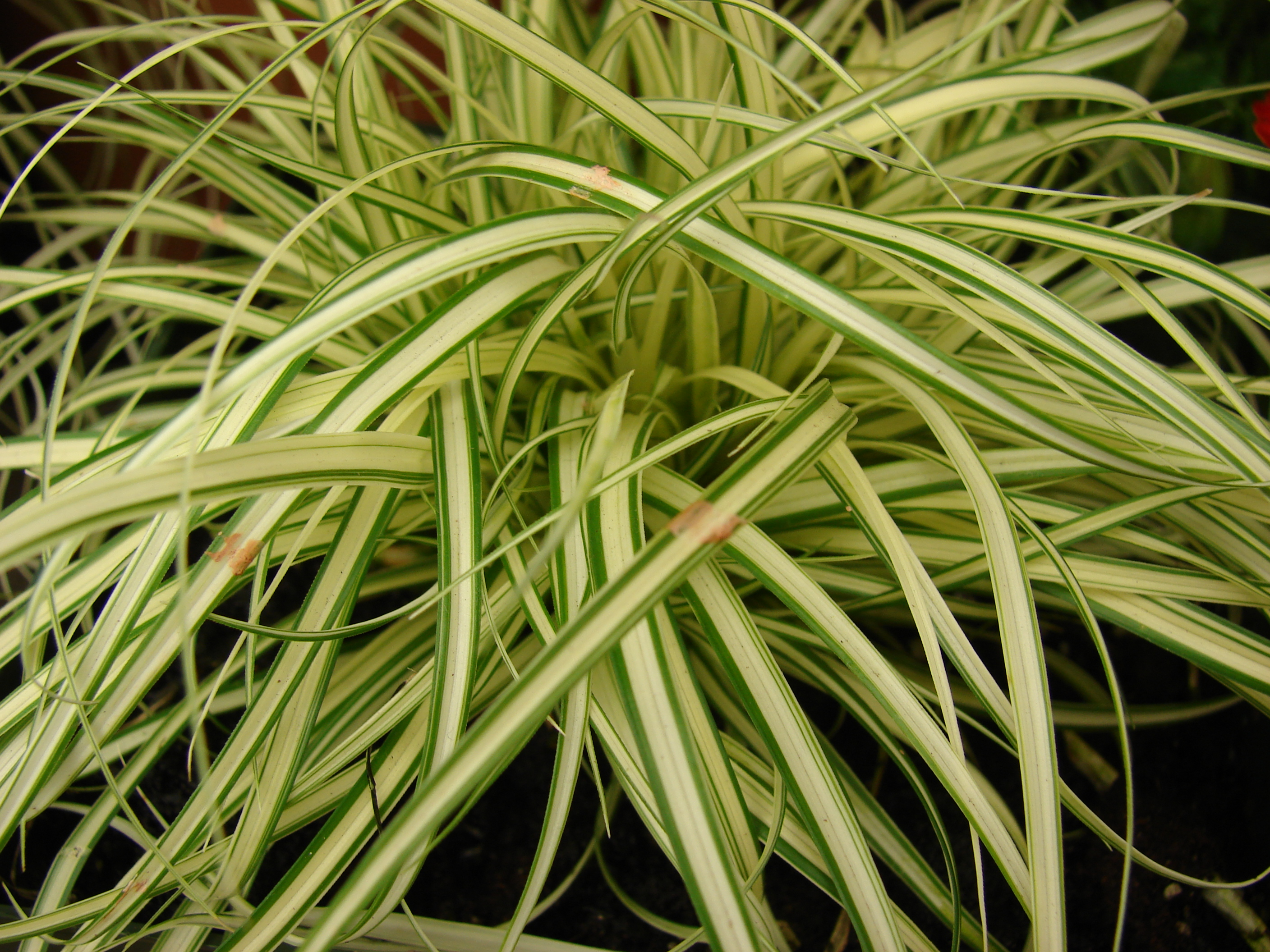

Scientific classification
- Kingdom: Plantae
- Clade: Tracheophytes
- Clade: Angiosperms
- Clade: Monocots
- Clade: Commelinids
- Order: Poales
- Family: Cyperaceae
- Genus: Carex
- Species: C. hachijoensis

Binomial name
- Carex hachijoensis Akiyama

= Carex hachijoensis =

Species of grass-like plant

Carex hachijoensis is a sedge of the Cyperaceae family that is native to temperate parts of eastern Asia in Japan. It is native to Hachijo Island, a small island located to the east of Honshu, Japan's largest island.

The species was named by the botanist Shigeo Akiyama in 1937.

The culms, the flowering stems, are three sided and 20–40 centimeters (7.9–15.7 in) tall. The leaves are longer than the culms with a width of 6–7 millimeters. Like the culms they are nearly hairless; they are dark green and somewhat thick in comparison with other sedge leaves.

Carex hachijoensis is not likely to be in cultivation. The variegated cultivar 'Evergold' is misidentified as this species but is actually Carex oshimensis.

== See also ==
- List of Carex species
