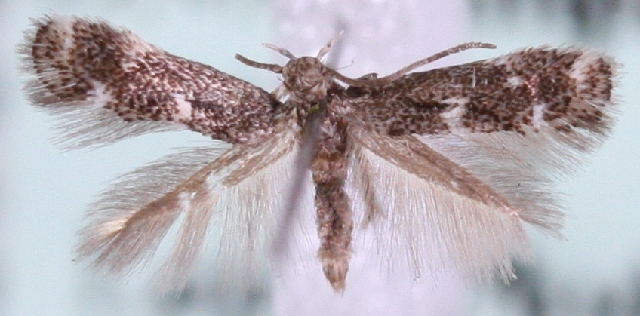

Scientific classification
- Domain: Eukaryota
- Kingdom: Animalia
- Phylum: Arthropoda
- Class: Insecta
- Order: Lepidoptera
- Family: Elachistidae
- Genus: Elachista
- Species: E. tetragonella

Binomial name
- Elachista tetragonella (Herrich-Schäffer, 1855)

Synonyms
- Poeciloptilia tetragonella Herrich-Schaffer 1855

= Elachista tetragonella =

Species of moth

Elachista tetragonella is a moth of the family Elachistidae. It is found from Fennoscandia to Spain and Italy and from France to Bulgaria.

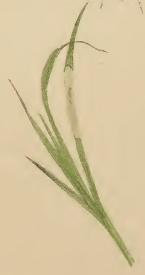
A sprig of Carex montana exhibiting a mined leaf blade

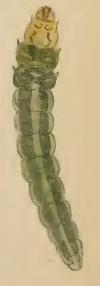
Larva

The wingspan is 6–7 millimetres (0.24–0.28 in). Adults are on wing in January and again in June.

The larvae feed on Carex montana. They mine the leaves of their host plant. The mine has the form of a white elongate gallery in the top region of the leaf. The frass is deposited irregularly. Pupation takes place outside of the mine. They are dirty yellow with a pair of grey dorsal length lines and a yellowish head. Larvae can be found from April to the end of May.
