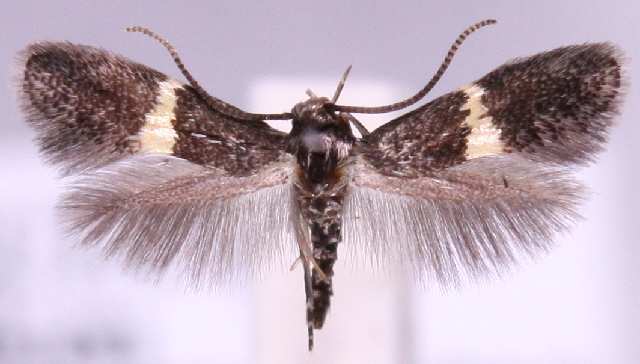

Scientific classification
- Kingdom: Animalia
- Phylum: Arthropoda
- Clade: Pancrustacea
- Class: Insecta
- Order: Lepidoptera
- Family: Elachistidae
- Genus: Elachista
- Species: E. chrysodesmella

Binomial name
- Elachista chrysodesmella Zeller, 1850

= Elachista chrysodesmella =

Species of moth

Elachista chrysodesmella is a moth of the family Elachistidae. It is found from Sweden to the Iberian Peninsula, Italy and Romania and from France to Russia and Ukraine.

The wingspan is 7–8 millimetres (0.28–0.31 in). Adults are on wing from May to June and again from July to August.

The larvae feed on Brachypodium pinnatum, Brachypodium sylvaticum, Carex humilis, Carex montana, Dactylis glomerata, Holcus and Poa trivialis. They mine the leaves of their host plant. Pupation takes place outside of the mine. Larvae can be found from early spring to May and again from July to the beginning of August. They are pale yellow.
