= List of plants known as hairy sedge =

Hairy sedge is a common name for the plant Carex hirta, native to Europe.

Hairy sedge may also refer to:

- Carex comans, native to New Zealand
- Carex hirta, native to Europe
- Carex hirtifolia, native to north-eastern North America
- Carex lacustris, native to North America
- Carex pilosa, native to temperate Eurasia
