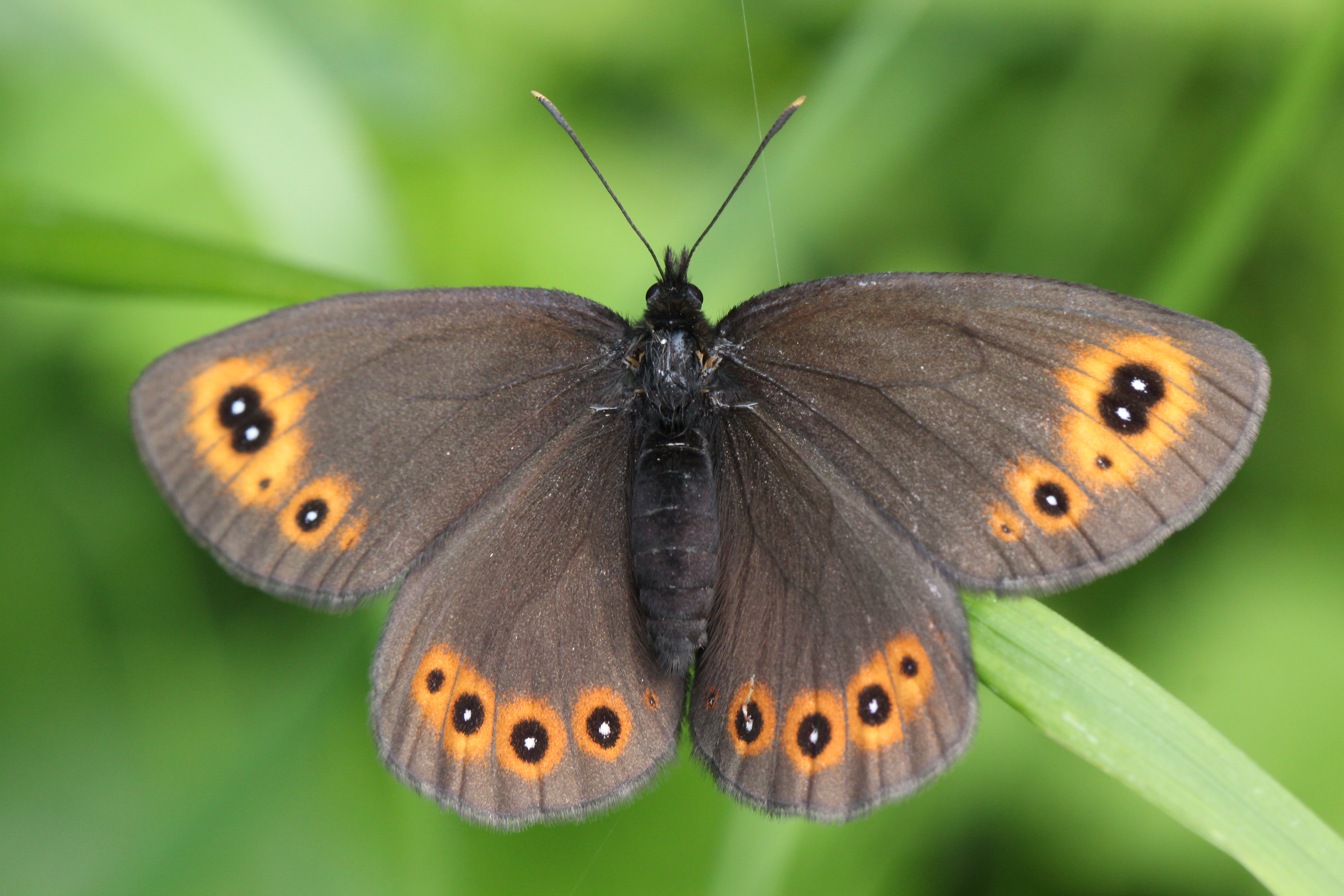
- Upperside
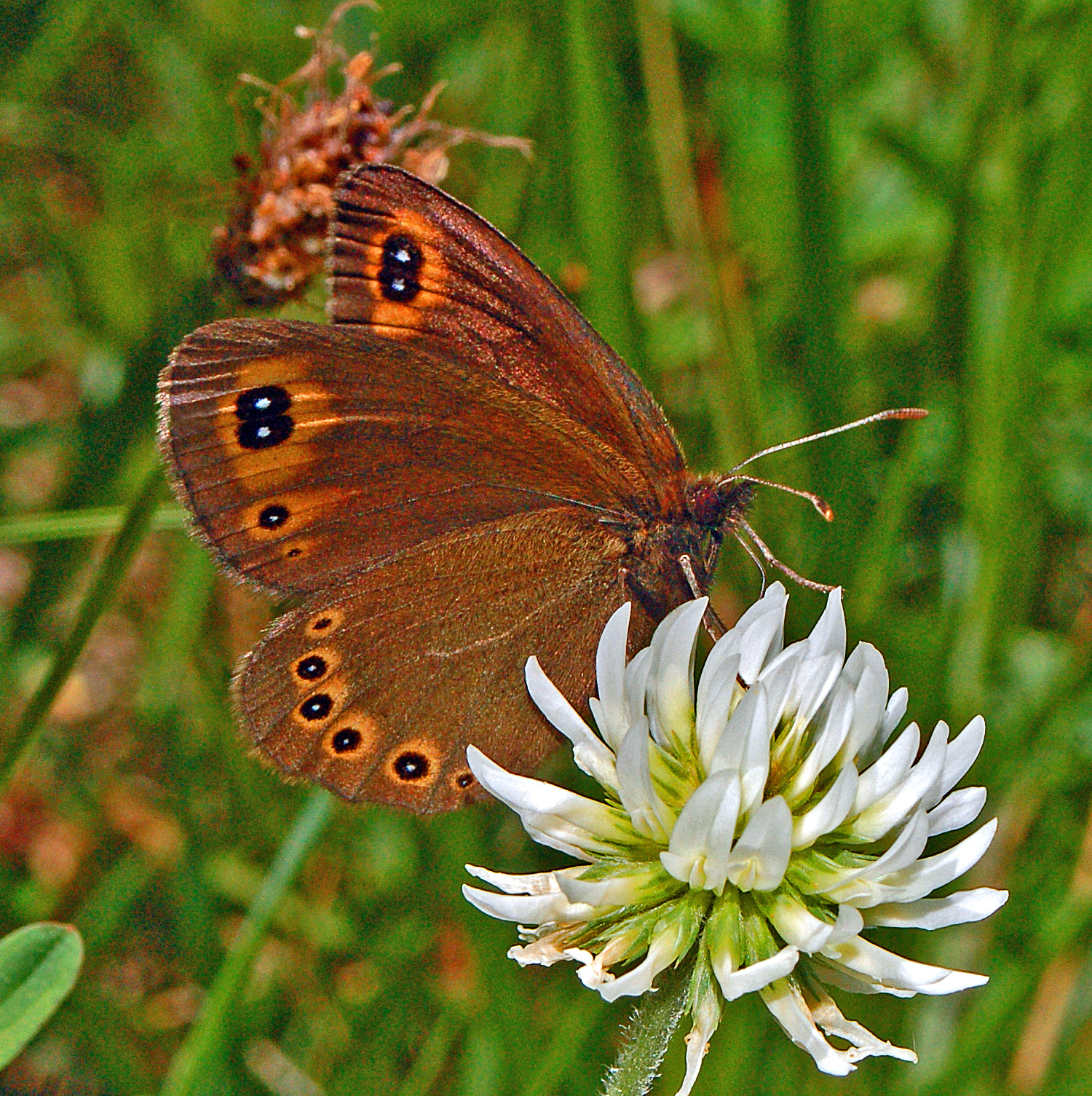
- Underside

Scientific classification
- Kingdom: Animalia
- Phylum: Arthropoda
- Clade: Pancrustacea
- Class: Insecta
- Order: Lepidoptera
- Family: Nymphalidae
- Genus: Erebia
- Species: E. medusa

Binomial name
- Erebia medusa (Denis & Schiffermüller, 1775)

Synonyms
- List: Erebia brigobanna Fruhstorfer, 1917; Hipparchia hippomedusa Ochsenheimer, 1820; Papilio psodea Hübner, 1804; Erebia medea Borkhausen, 1788; Papilio mergus Fabricius, 1793; Erebia themistocles (De Loche, 1801); Erebia hippomedusa Meisner, 1818; Erebia eumenis Freyer, 1833; Erebia florinensis Lambillion, 1903; Erebia pseudomedusa Strand, 1903; Erebia difflua Blachier, 1910; Erebia postnigra Vorbrodt, 1921; Erebia albinotica Osthelder, 1925; Erebia albofasciata Osthelder, 1925; Erebia depupillata Osthelder, 1925; Erebia luxurians Osthelder, 1925; Erebia mairloti Cabeau, 1925; Erebia effusa Osthelder, 1925; Erebia semigrisea Cabeau, 1927; Erebia alpestris Warren, 1936; Erebia dolomitica Warren, 1936; Erebia sylvatica Warren, 1936; Erebia honei Holtz, 1937; Erebia manchurica Atsumura, 1939; Erebia paradoxa Slaby, 1950; Erebia infralbosparsa Verity, 1953; Erebia macrommata Verity, 1953; Erebia pulchrappenina Verity, 1953; Erebia parumgenerosa Verity, 1953; Erebia botevi Slaby, 1979

= Erebia medusa =

Woodland ringlet

Species of butterfly

Erebia medusa, the woodland ringlet, is a member of the subfamily Satyrinae of the family Nymphalidae.

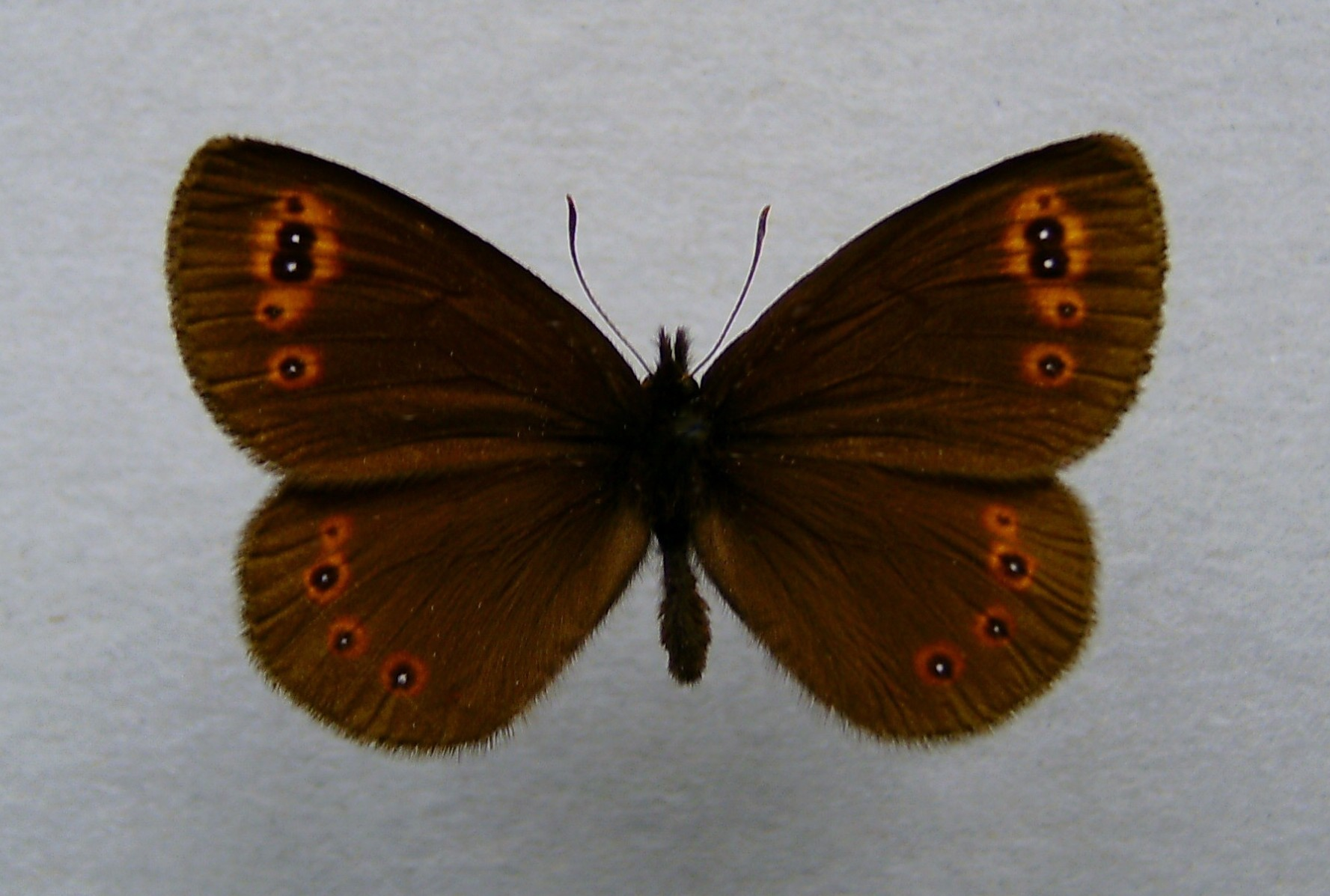
Museum specimen

== Subspecies ==
Subspecies include:

- Erebia medusa brigobanna Fruhstorfer, 1917
- Erebia medusa euphrasia Fruhstorfer, 1917 (Bulgaria, Bosnia)
- Erebia medusa hippomedusa (Alps)
- Erebia medusa medusa
- Erebia medusa psodea Hübner, 1804 (Eastern Europe, Caucasus)
- Erebia medusa schansiana Goltz, 1937
- Erebia medusa transiens Heyne, 1895
- Erebia medusa turkestana Eisner, 1946 (Turkestan)
- Erebia medusa uralensis Staudinger, 1871

== Distribution and habitat ==
This species is present in most of Europe, from France across central and eastern Europe to western Asia. These butterflies prefer clearings, grassy and humid wastelands, damp grasslands and moors and sunny forest edges, at an elevation of 300–2,300 metres (980–7,550 ft) above sea level.

== Description ==
Erebia medusa has a wingspan of 44–52 millimetres (1.7–2.0 in). The antennae are club shaped. Wings are dark brown. Forewings have an orange-yellow postmedian band, with two adjacent pupillated ocelli near the apex and one or two smaller ones. There are at least four bright orange ringed eyespots on the hindwing. The number of eyespots is rather variable. The two sides of the wings are similar. The female is generally paler than the male. The ribbed eggs are white or light green speckled with brown. The caterpillars are about 20 millimeters long, light beige or pale green with a dark dorsal stripe. The chrysalis is light brown.

== Description in Seitz ==
E. medusa F. (= ligea Esp., themistocles de Loche, medea Bkh.) (35 f). In the reddish yellow macular distal band there are two larger white-centred black ocelli near the apex placed close together, being sometimes united. The ocelli which are situated in the other spots—usually 3—are smaller, being often represented by blind black dots. The hindwing has 3 – 4 reddish yellow separated spots bearing white-centred black ocelli. The somewhat lighter underside has the same pattern as the upper. Modifications as regards the number of the ocelli and reddish yellow spots occur frequently. Central Europe, from Northern Germany and Belgium southward to South France, Central Italy and the Balcan, eastwards to the Amur, flying also in the plains.

— In the form psodea Hbn. (= eumenis Frr) [subspecies](35 f) the macular band is somewhat lighter and broader; the ocelli, especially in the band of the hindwing, are larger and bear a more conspicuous white pupil. In South Hungary, the Balcan, Caucasus, and Western Siberia : is said to occur occasionally in Central Europe as aberration. — procopiani Hormuz., with blind ocelli, is a smaller form from the Bukowina. — hippomedusa O. [subspecies] (35 g) is still smaller; occurs in the alpine regions, the macular band being reduced and the ocelli smaller. — polaris Stgr. [var.](35 g) is but little larger than the preceding form, the macular band being obsolescent on the hindwing beneath. Lapland, Finmark, Norway - uralensis Stgr.[subspecies] (= medusa Er.) (35 g), with less ocelli, otherwise but little different from polaris, forming a transition towards the latter, the underside of the hindwing being different. In the Southern Ural, the Kirghizsteppe and the adjacent districts of Siberia. — subalpina Gumpp var. Gumppenberg, 1888]. Beneath like medusa, but deep black above, the forewing bearing ferruginous red black-dotted spots; in the Bavarian Alps, up to 3000 ft. — transiens Ruhl-Heyne [var.] (= medusa var. Stgr) comes nearer psodea; the ocelli are larger and more numerous than in medusa; the hindwing beneath more or less dusted with grey in the female; East Siberia. — Larva light green, with light-edged dark dorsal line, a light line above the stigmata, a white line above the legs, and 2 black ocelli on the head. It feeds on various grasses, as Panicum sanguinale, Millium effusum, etc., hibernates and changes the end of April into a light grey pupa, which lies on the ground in a loose web, the butterfly appearing in 4 weeks. The species is on the wing from the end of May to early July, occurring in the woods in meadows and on grassy roads, in road-ditches, etc., the flight being slow but irregular and probing. The males are very abundant, while the females remain at rest, appearing but towards the end of the period of flight.

== Biology ==
The females lay their eggs individually or in small groups on grasses. Caterpillars feed on Gramineae, Digitaria, Milium effusum, Panicum, Setaria, Brachypodium, Festuca and Bromus species. Adults fly from May to August. This species overwinters as a caterpillar for one or two years depending on the altitude of its habitat.

== Etymology ==
Named in the Classical tradition. Medusa is the only mortal of the three Gorgon sisters. She is beheaded by Perseus.

== Bibliography ==
- M. Chinery et P. Leraut, Photoguide des papillons d'Europe, Delachaux et Niestlé (ISBN 2-603-01114-6)
- Stuhldrehrer, G. & T. Fartmann (2015): Oviposition-site preferences of a declining butterfly Erebia medusa (Lepidoptera: Satyrinae) in nutrient-poor grasslands. — European Journal for Entomology 112(3): 493–499
- Tom Tolman, Richard Lewington, Guide des papillons d'Europe et d'Afrique du Nord, Delachaux et Niestlé, 1998 - (ISBN 2603011146)
