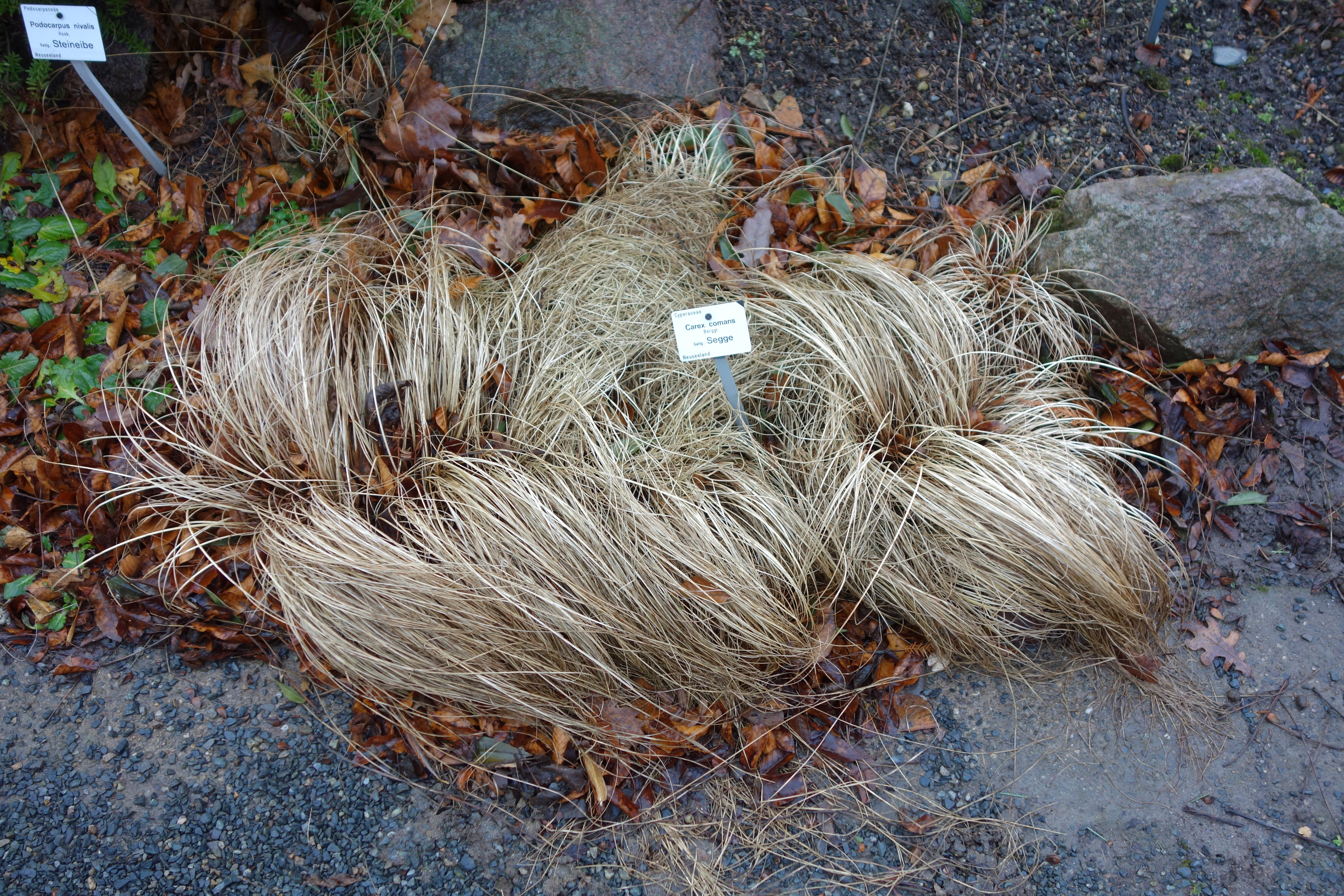

Scientific classification
- Kingdom: Plantae
- Clade: Tracheophytes
- Clade: Angiosperms
- Clade: Monocots
- Clade: Commelinids
- Order: Poales
- Family: Cyperaceae
- Genus: Carex
- Species: C. comans

Binomial name
- Carex comans Berggr.

= Carex comans =

Species of grass-like plant

Carex comans is a plant species in the sedge family, Cyperaceae, endemic to New Zealand. It is used as an ornamental plant, growing in clumps of bluish green leaves with heights of 25–35 centimetres.

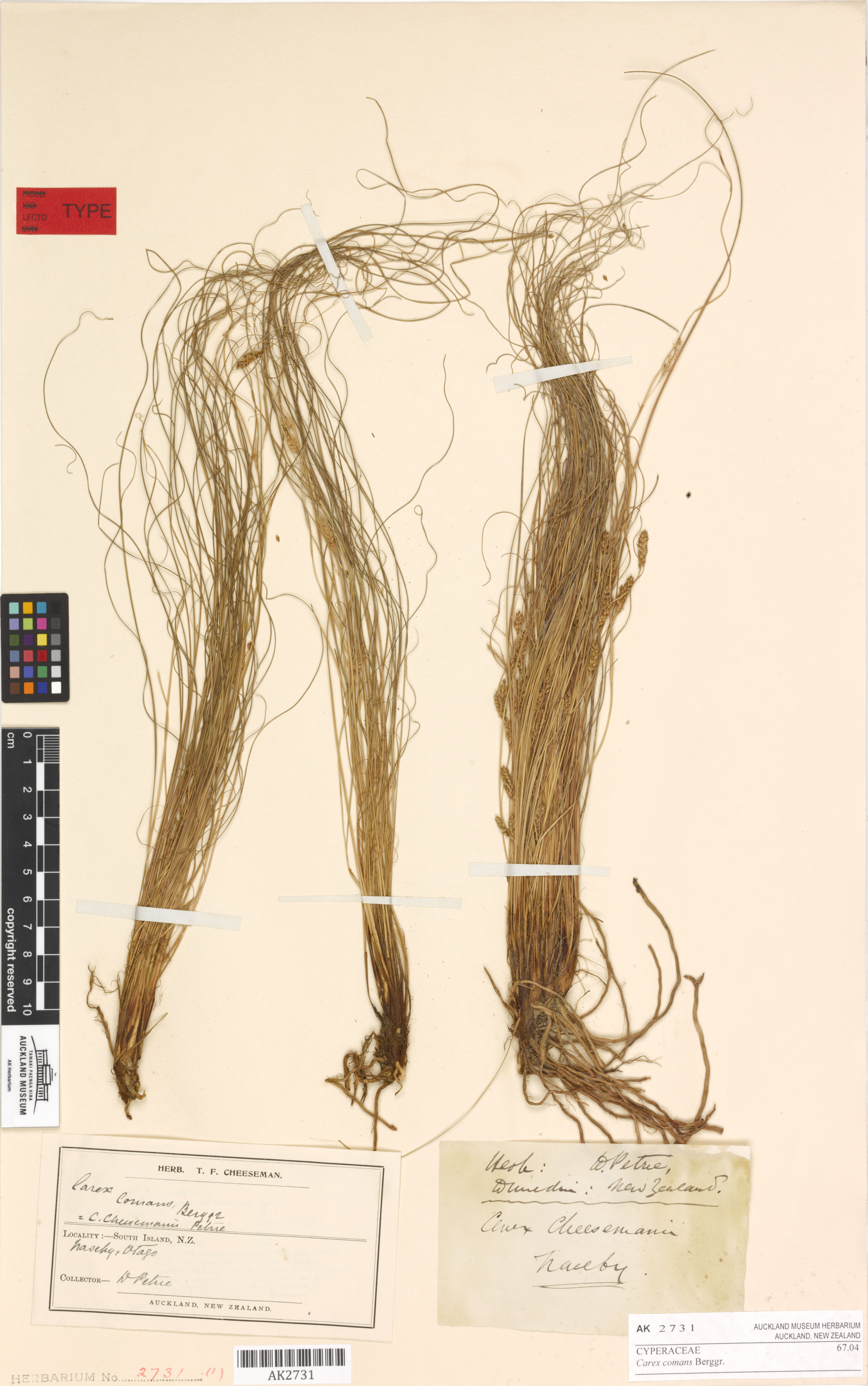
Lectotype: Auckland Museum (AM AK2731-1)
