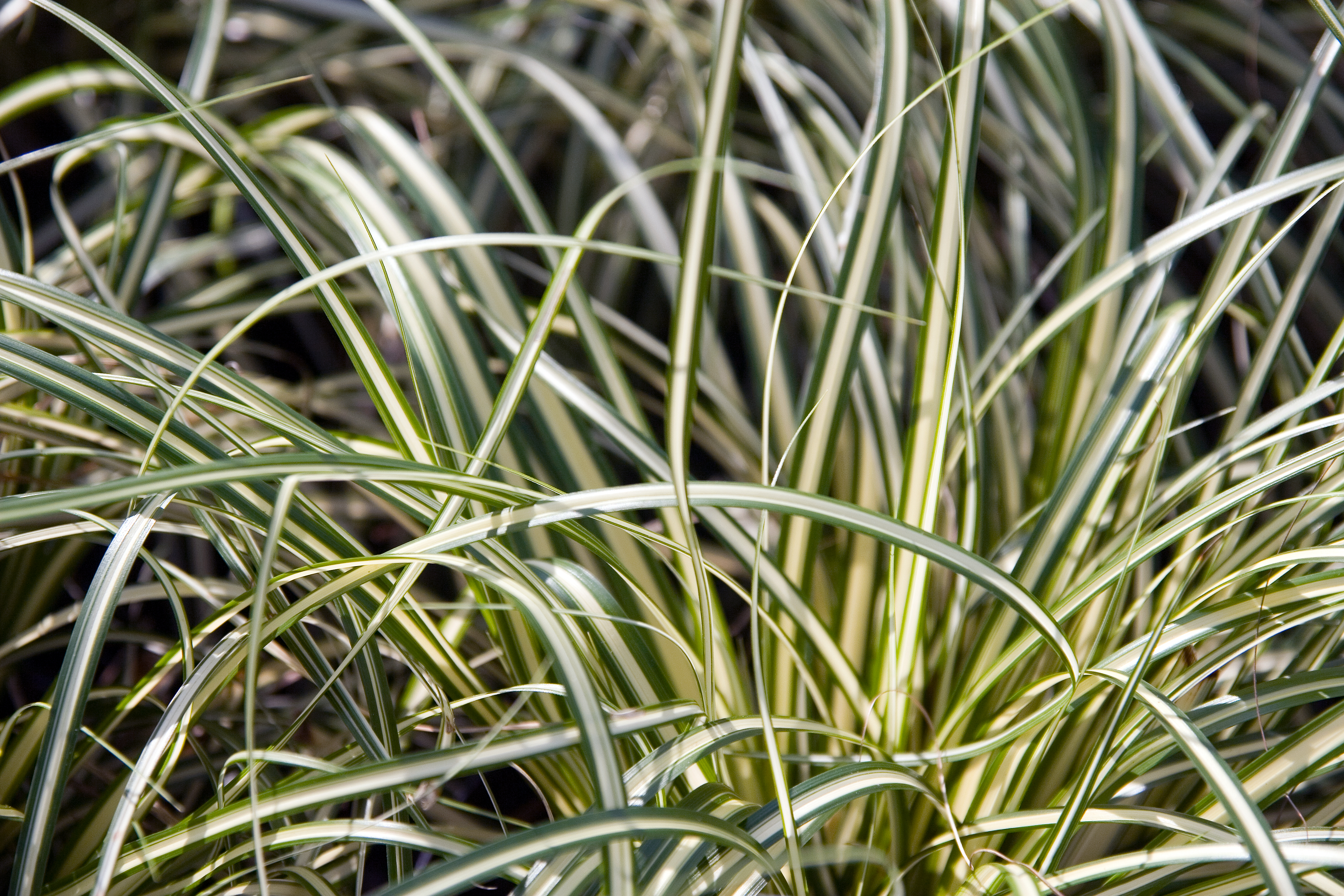
- Carex oshimensis 'Evergold'

Scientific classification
- Kingdom: Plantae
- Clade: Tracheophytes
- Clade: Angiosperms
- Clade: Monocots
- Clade: Commelinids
- Order: Poales
- Family: Cyperaceae
- Genus: Carex
- Species: C. oshimensis

Binomial name
- Carex oshimensis Nakai

Synonyms
- Carex oshimensis f. variegata Hid.Takah.

= Carex oshimensis =

Species of flowering plant

Carex oshimensis, the Japanese sedge (a name it shares with Carex morrowii), is a species of flowering plant in the genus Carex, native to Japan. With its striped foliage, it is widely used as a non‑spreading ground cover. Its cultivar 'Evergold' has gained the Royal Horticultural Society's Award of Garden Merit. Growing to 50 cm (20 in) tall and broad, it has a broad yellow stripe down the centre of each leaf. It is an easy subject for moist soils in sun or partial shade.
