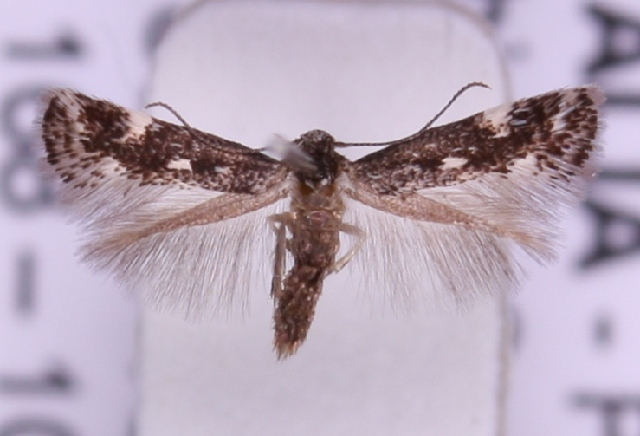

Scientific classification
- Kingdom: Animalia
- Phylum: Arthropoda
- Class: Insecta
- Order: Lepidoptera
- Family: Elachistidae
- Genus: Elachista
- Species: E. juliensis

Binomial name
- Elachista juliensis Frey, 1870

Synonyms
- Elachista freyi Staudinger, 1870; Biselachista ingeborgae Traugott-Olsen, 1994; Elachista klimeschi Traugott-Olsen, 1994

= Elachista juliensis =

Species of moth

Elachista juliensis is a moth of the family, Elachistidae that is found from Germany to Italy and from Switzerland to Slovakia and Hungary.

The larvae feed on Carex humilis. They mine the leaves of their host plant. They are wax-coloured. Larvae can be found from May to early June.
