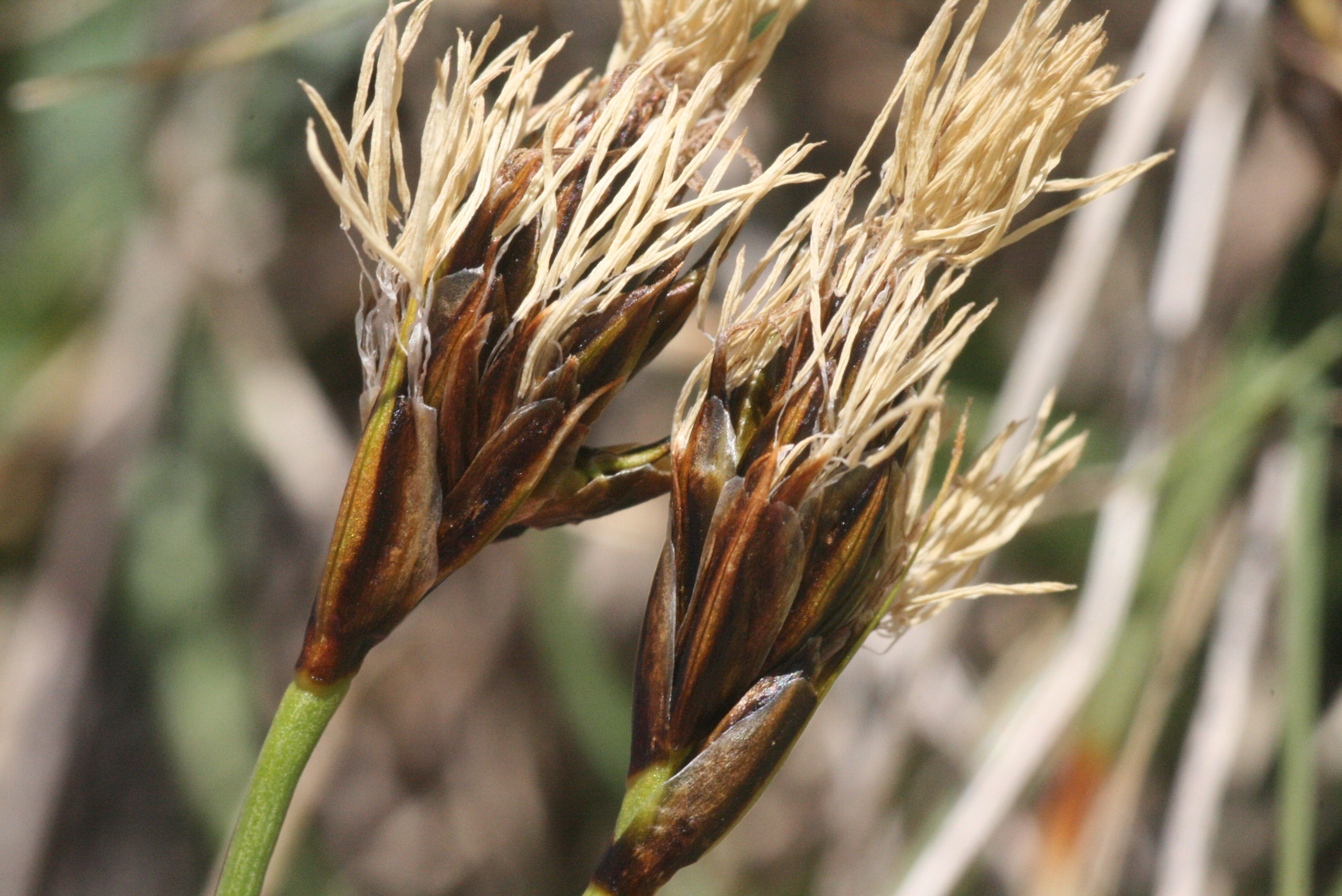
- Flowers
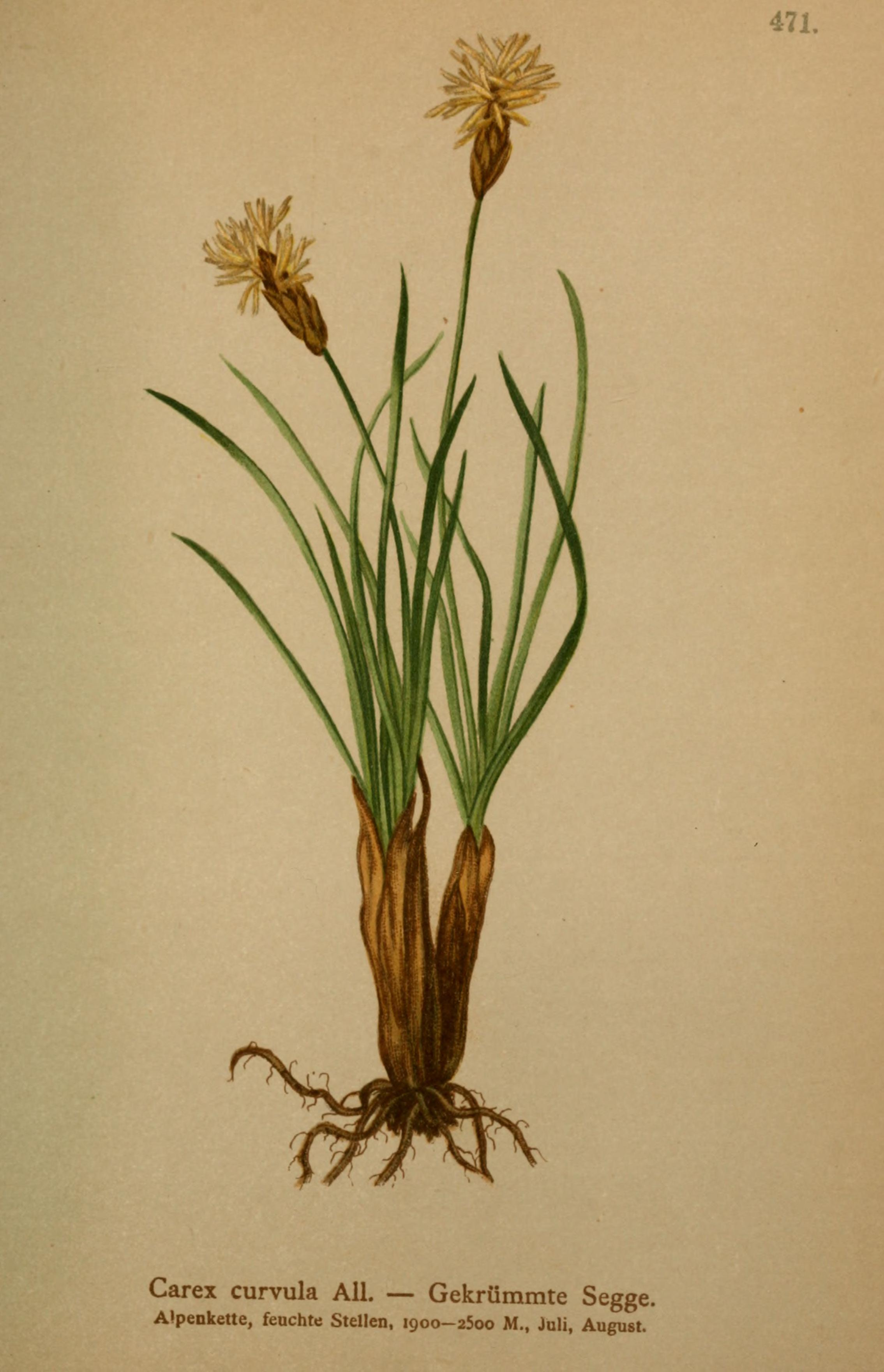
- Botanical illustration

Scientific classification
- Kingdom: Plantae
- Clade: Tracheophytes
- Clade: Angiosperms
- Clade: Monocots
- Clade: Commelinids
- Order: Poales
- Family: Cyperaceae
- Genus: Carex
- Species: C. curvula

Binomial name
- Carex curvula All.

Synonyms
- List: Caricina curvula (All.) St.-Lag.; Cryptoglochin curvulus (All.) Heuff.; Kobresia curvula (All.) N.A.Ivanova

= Carex curvula =

Species of flowering plant

Carex curvula, the Alpine sedge (a name it shares with other members of its genus), is a species of flowering plant in the genus Carex, native to the Pyrenees, the Alps, the Carpathians, and the mountains of the Balkans. It has gone extinct in Germany. It propagates almost exclusively clonally, with some of its clonal colonies estimated to be 2,000 years old.

== Subtaxa ==
The following subspecies are currently accepted:

- Carex curvula subsp. curvula
- Carex curvula subsp. rosae Gilomen
