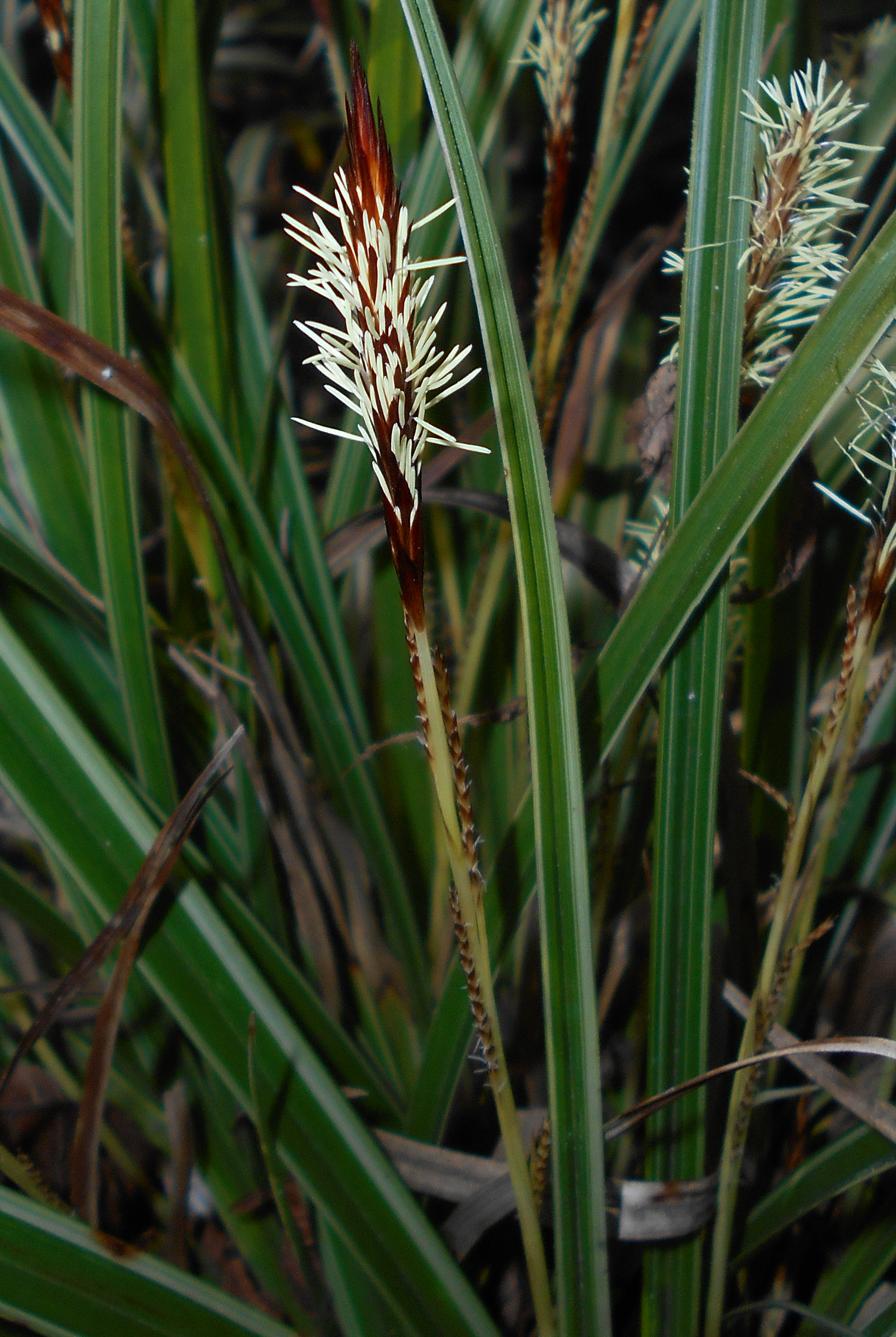
- Flowers
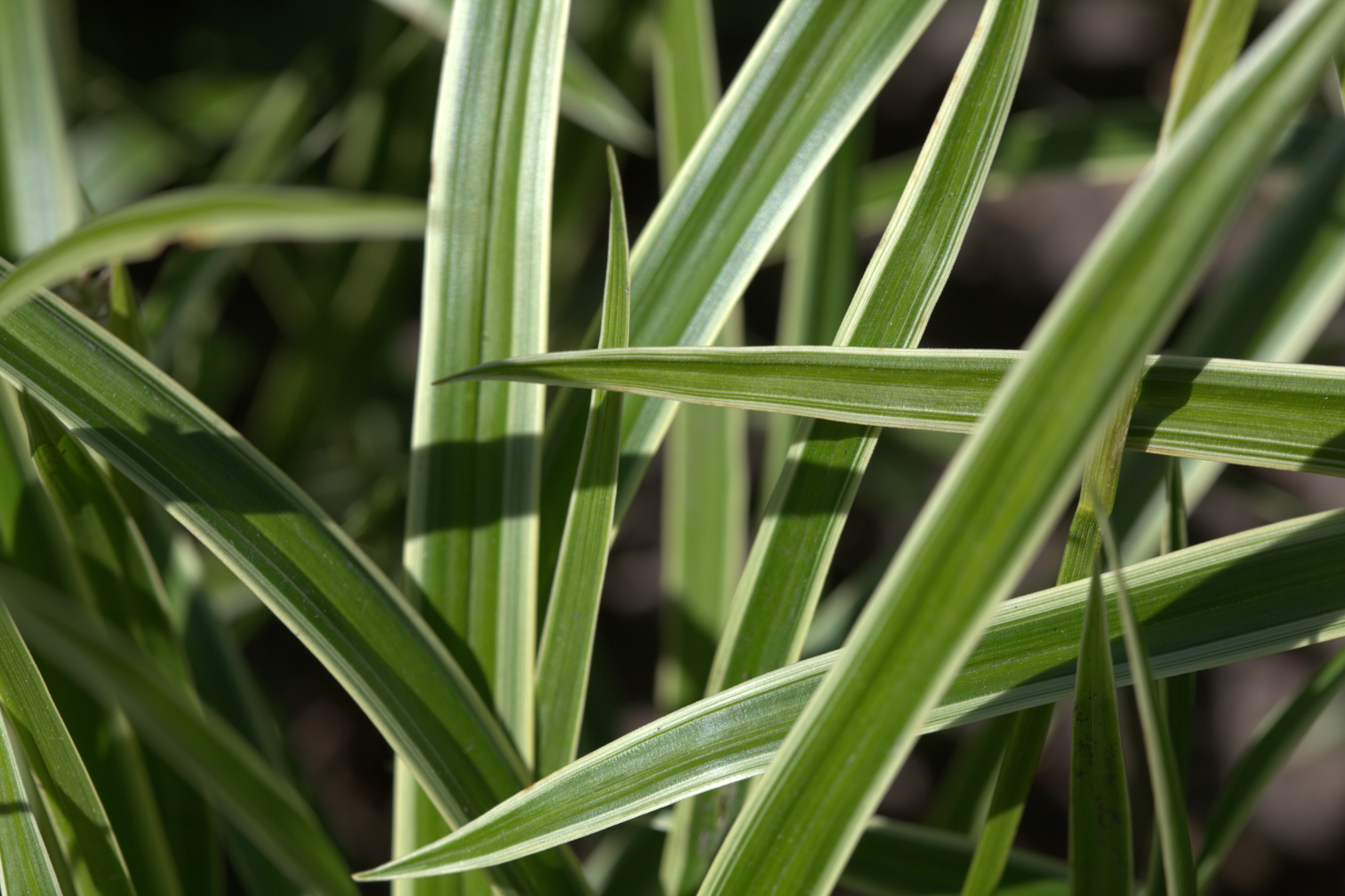
- 'Ice Dance' cultivar

Scientific classification
- Kingdom: Plantae
- Clade: Tracheophytes
- Clade: Angiosperms
- Clade: Monocots
- Clade: Commelinids
- Order: Poales
- Family: Cyperaceae
- Genus: Carex
- Species: C. morrowii

Binomial name
- Carex morrowii Boott

Synonyms
- Carex kinpokusanensis Akiyama; Carex temnolepis Franch.

= Carex morrowii =

Species of flowering plant

Carex morrowii, the kan suge, Morrow's sedge, Japanese grass sedge or Japanese sedge (a name it shares with Carex oshimensis), is a species of flowering plant in the family Cyperaceae. It is native to central and southern Japan, and has been introduced to Belgium, Denmark and Austria.

An ornamental sedge with a large number of (mostly variegated) cultivars, it tolerates heavy shade and wet soil, and is erosion and deer-resistant. Consequently it is recommended as a slowly spreading ground cover, for naturalizing, and in rain gardens. It is hardy in USDA zones 5 through 9 and does well in containers.

== Subtaxa ==
The following varieties are currently accepted:

- Carex morrowii var. laxa Ohwi – Yakushima
- Carex morrowii var. morrowii
- Carex morrowii var. temnolepis (Franch.) Ohwi – Japan

== Cultivars ==
A large number of cultivars are commercially available, including:

- 'Everglow'
- 'Fisher's Form'
- 'Gilt'
- 'Gold Band'
- 'Ice Dance'
- 'Irish Green'
- 'Nana Variegata'
- 'Pinkie'
- 'Silk Tassel' (Note: A cultivar of C. morrowii var. temnolepis)
- 'Vanilla Ice'
- 'Variegata'
