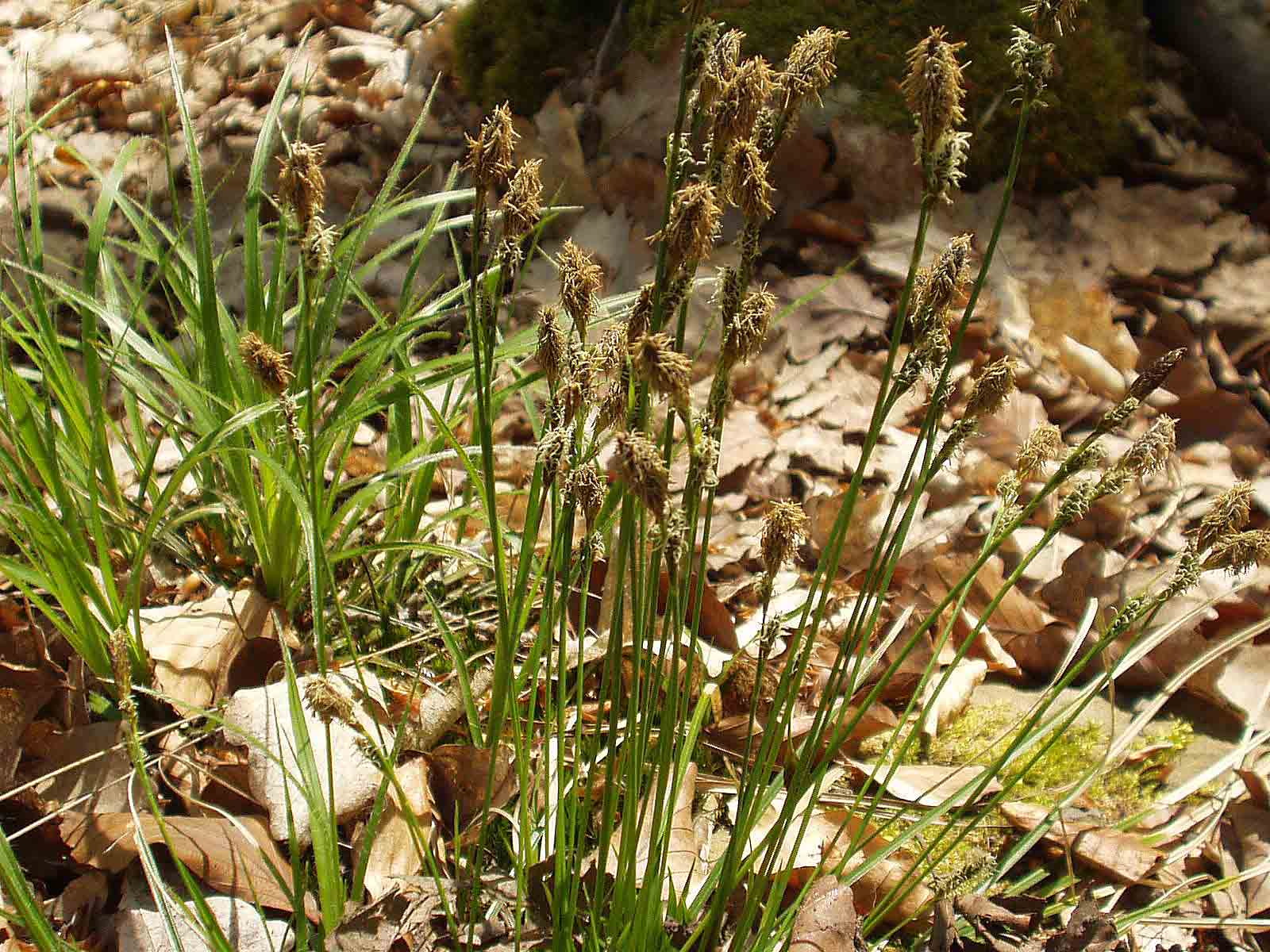

Conservation status
- Least Concern (IUCN 3.1)

Scientific classification
- Kingdom: Plantae
- Clade: Tracheophytes
- Clade: Angiosperms
- Clade: Monocots
- Clade: Commelinids
- Order: Poales
- Family: Cyperaceae
- Genus: Carex
- Section: Carex sect. Mitratae
- Species: C. umbrosa

Binomial name
- Carex umbrosa Host

Synonyms
- Carex caryophyllea var. umbrosa (Host) Fiori; Carex praecox var. umbrosa (Host) Wimm. & Grab.

= Carex umbrosa =

Species of plant in the sedge family

Carex umbrosa (commonly known as shady sedge), is a species of sedge native to Europe and Asia as far east as Japan.

== Description ==
Carex umbrosa is a perennial, tussock-forming, rhizomatous, grass-like plant, reaching about 15 cm in height. Leaves are flat-bladed, green, growing between 15 and 20 cm in height. Inflorescence is a spike, brown in colour, flowering in early summer.

== Taxonomy ==
The following infraspecifics are accepted:

- Carex umbrosa subsp. huetiana (Boiss.) Soó
- Carex umbrosa subsp. umbrosa
- Carex umbrosa subsp. pseudosabynensis T.V.Egorova.

== Distribution and habitat ==
This species grows throughout Europe to the Caucasus, Mongolia to Russian Far East and Korea. As the name suggests, it prefers shady conditions, and is commonly found in moist, acidic clay soil in forested locations.
