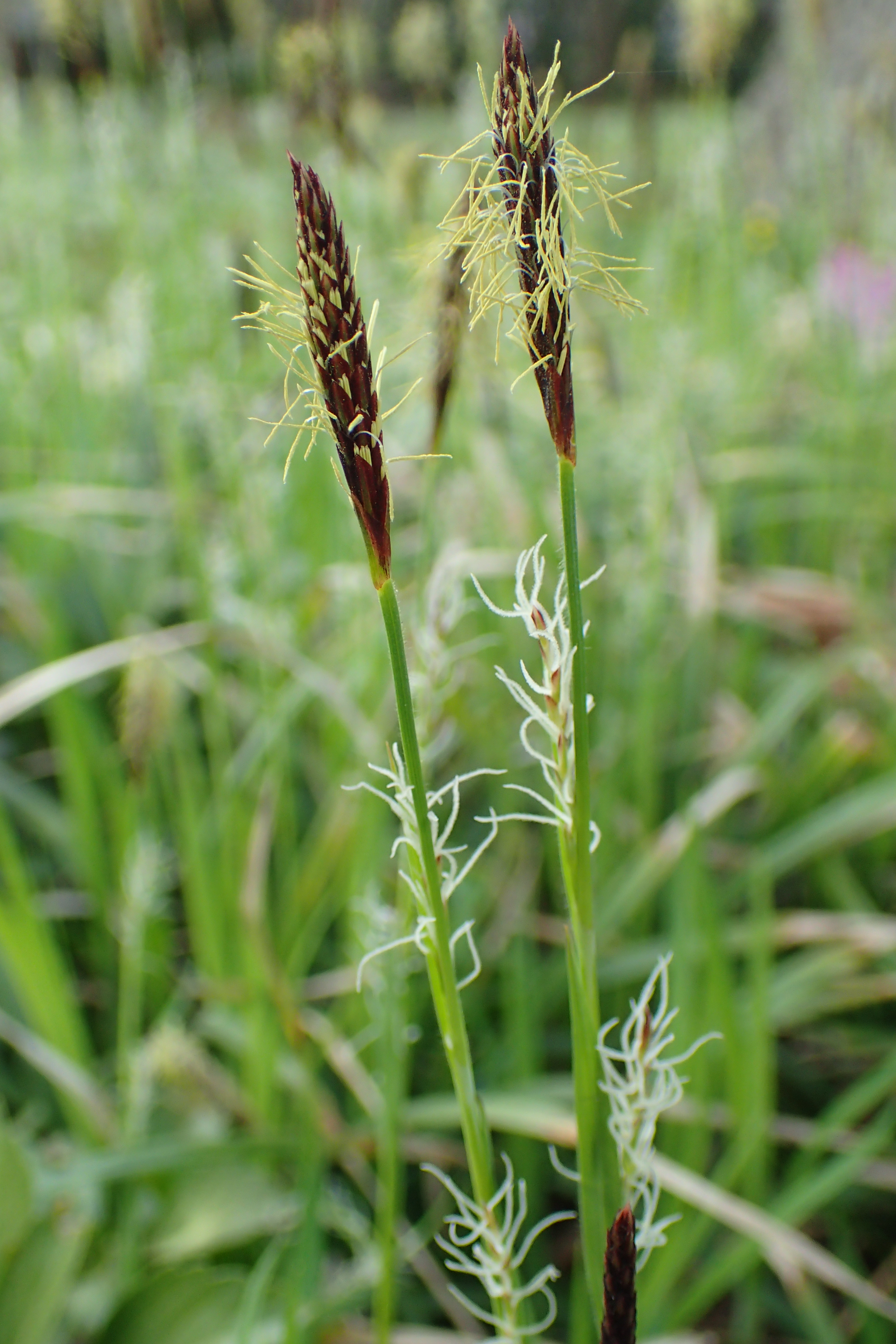
- 'Copenhagen Select' cultivar
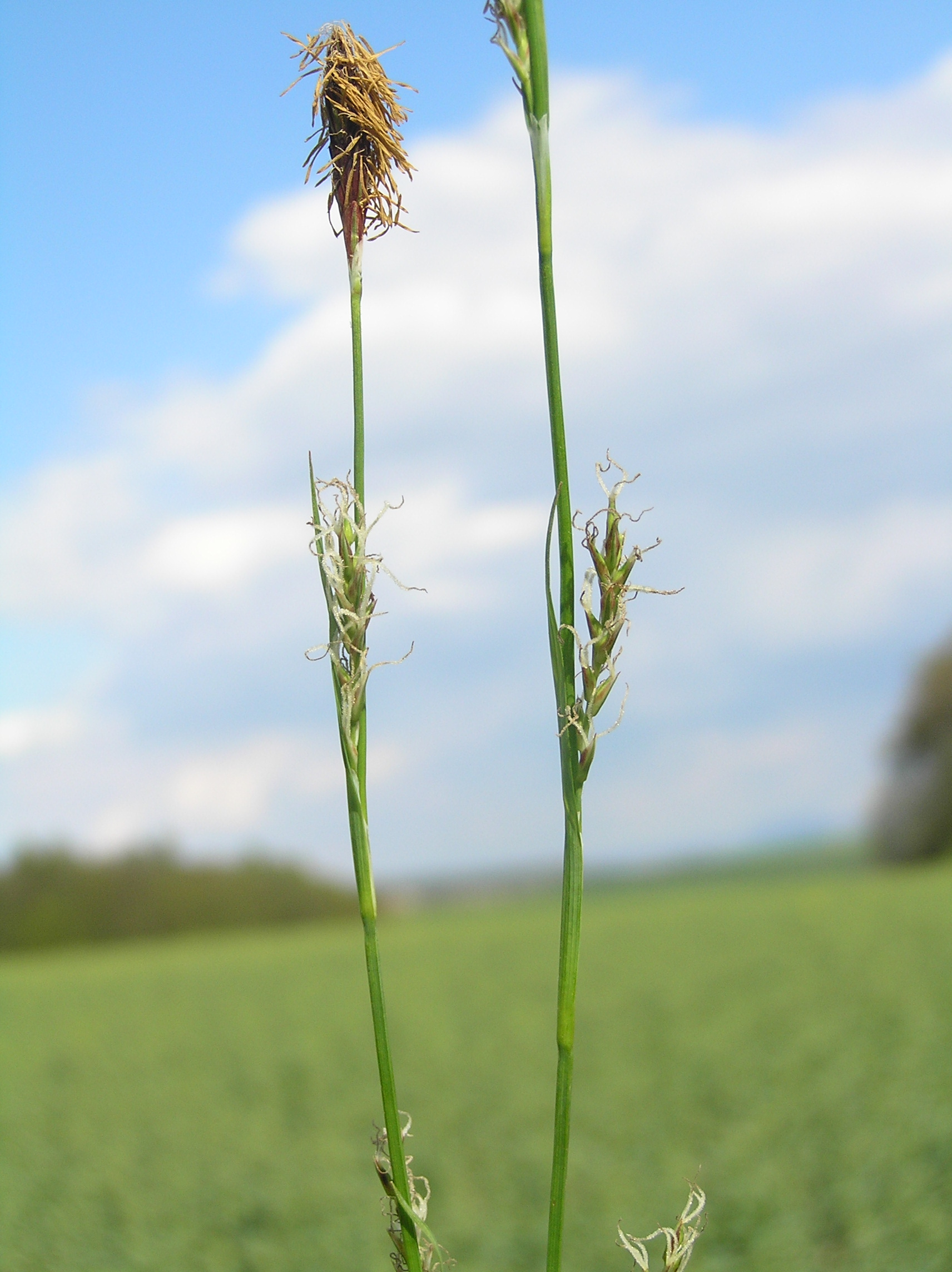
- Wild-type

Scientific classification
- Kingdom: Plantae
- Clade: Embryophytes
- Clade: Tracheophytes
- Clade: Spermatophytes
- Clade: Angiosperms
- Clade: Monocots
- Clade: Commelinids
- Order: Poales
- Family: Cyperaceae
- Genus: Carex
- Species: C. pilosa

Binomial name
- Carex pilosa Scop.

Synonyms
- List: Carex foliata F.Schmidt ex Meinsh.; Carex nemorensis J.F.Gmel.; Carex nemorosa J.F.Gmel.; Carex pilosa var. densiflora Schur.; Carex prostrata J.F.Gmel.; Loxotrema pilosa (Scop.) Raf.

= Carex pilosa =

Species of flowering plant

Carex pilosa, the hairy sedge (a name it shares with other members of its genus), is a species of flowering plant in the genus Carex, native to central and eastern Europe as far as the Urals. It is typically found in temperate forests, where it may be the dominant species on the forest floor.

== Description ==
Carex pilosa is a deciduous or evergreen, rhizomatous or tufted perennial, growing up to 60 cm (24 in) in height. Stems are triangular, with linear or strap-shaped leaves and spikes of tiny green or brown flowers, appearing between April and May.

== Distribution and habitat ==
C. pilosa favours woodland habitats, including oak and hornbeam forests, herb-rich beech forests and alluvial forests.
