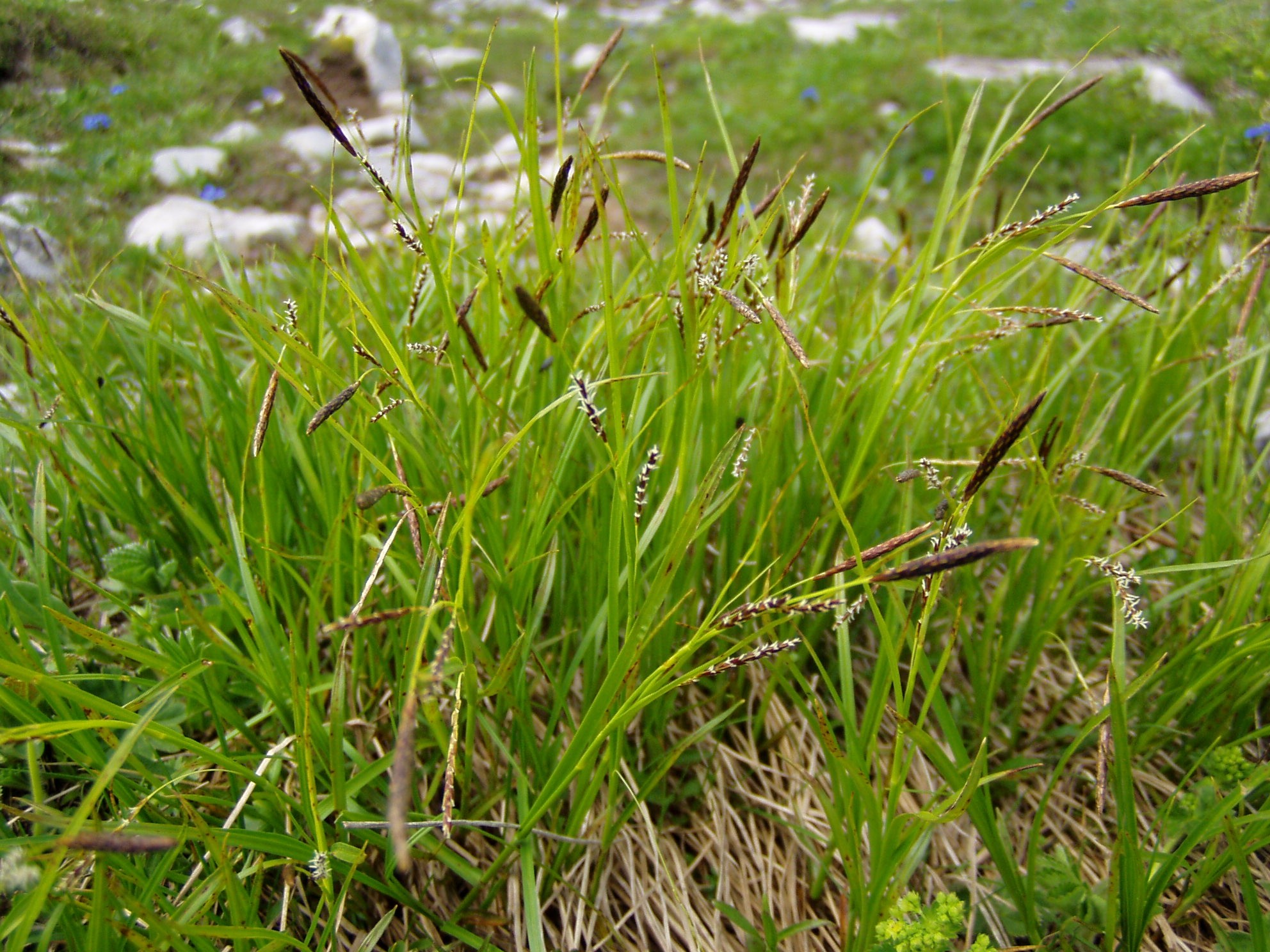
- Habit
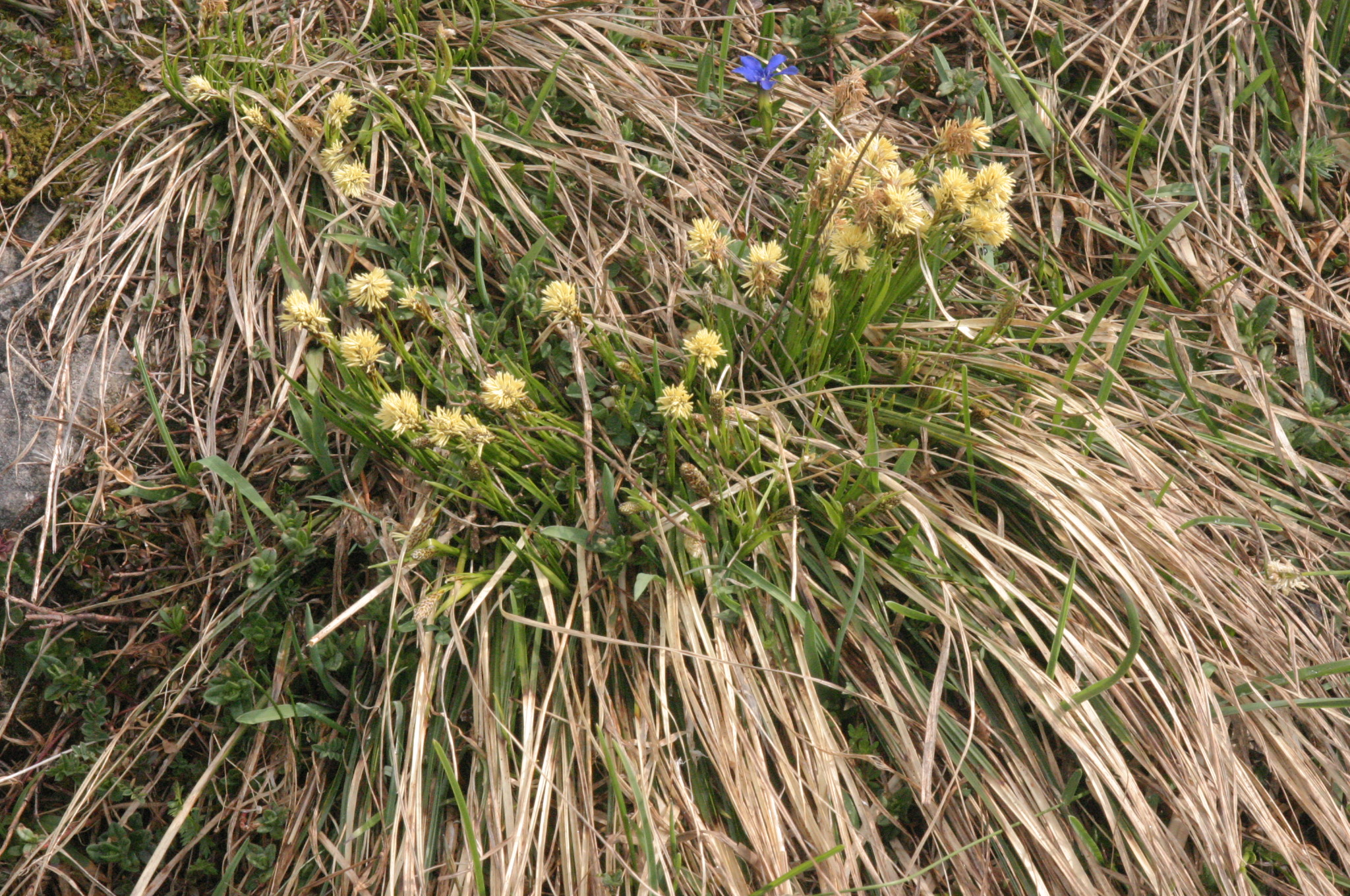

Scientific classification
- Kingdom: Plantae
- Clade: Embryophytes
- Clade: Tracheophytes
- Clade: Angiosperms
- Clade: Monocots
- Clade: Commelinids
- Order: Poales
- Family: Cyperaceae
- Genus: Carex
- Species: C. sempervirens

Binomial name
- Carex sempervirens Vill.

Synonyms
- List: Carex alpestris Gaudin; Carex alpina Schrank; Carex arida Schleich; Carex erecta DC; Carex ferruginea Schkuhr; Carex firma var. subalpina Wahlenb; Carex granitica Braun-Blanq; Carex murrii Appel; Carex sempervirens f. albicans Lackow; Carex sempervirens var. angustata B.Kotula; Carex sempervirens var. aurigerana Marcailhou; Carex sempervirens var. aurigerana Marcailhou; Carex sempervirens f. coarctata Huter; Carex sempervirens f. fastigiata Lackow; Carex sempervirens subsp. granitica (Braun-Blanq.); Carex sempervirens var. laevis (Kit. ex Willd.); Carex sempervirens subsp. laevis Kit.; Carex sempervirens f. laxiflora Schur; Carex sempervirens var. pseudotristis Domin; Carex sempervirens subsp. pseudotristis (Domin); Carex sempervirens f. pumila Schur; Carex sempervirens f. rigida Schur; Carex sempervirens f. schkuhriana Bonnet; Carex sempervirens f. semipallescens Kneuck; Carex sempervirens var. setifolia Kumm. & Sendtn; Carex sempervirens subsp. silicicola Holub; Carex sempervirens f. stenophylla Schur; Carex sempervirens subsp. tatrorum (Zapał.); Carex sempervirens var. trichocarpa Schur; Carex sempervirens f. villarsiana Bonnet & J.A.Richt; Carex tatrorum (Zapał.); Carex trichocarpa Schur; Carex tristis var. tatrorum Zapał; Carex varia Host; Carex wazmanni Schrank.; Trasus erectus (DC.)

= Carex sempervirens =

Species of plant in the sedge family

Carex sempervirens, called the evergreen sedge, is a species of tussock-forming flowering plant in the family Cyperaceae, native to the mountains of Europe. It is common in nutrient-limited grasslands above and below the treeline.

== Description ==
Carex sempervirens is a vigorous, perennial grass-like plant, growing between 20–50 cm in height; glabrous, with a very tenacious rootstock; the stem leafy only at the base. Leaves are 2–4 mm wide, rough, and shorter than the stem. The male spike is solitary, oblong, pale brown; female spikes are spread apart, oblong, somewhat loose, always erect. Sheathing bracts are often shorter than the peduncles; with brownish, lanceolate scales. Utricles are rusty brown, oblong-lanceolate (5–6 mm), slightly veined, ending in a long, bifid beak. It flowers between May and August.

== Distribution and habitat ==
Carex sempervirens favours chalky, nutrient-limited grasslands and rocky mountain habitats. It flourishes at altitudes of 1500–2400 m.
