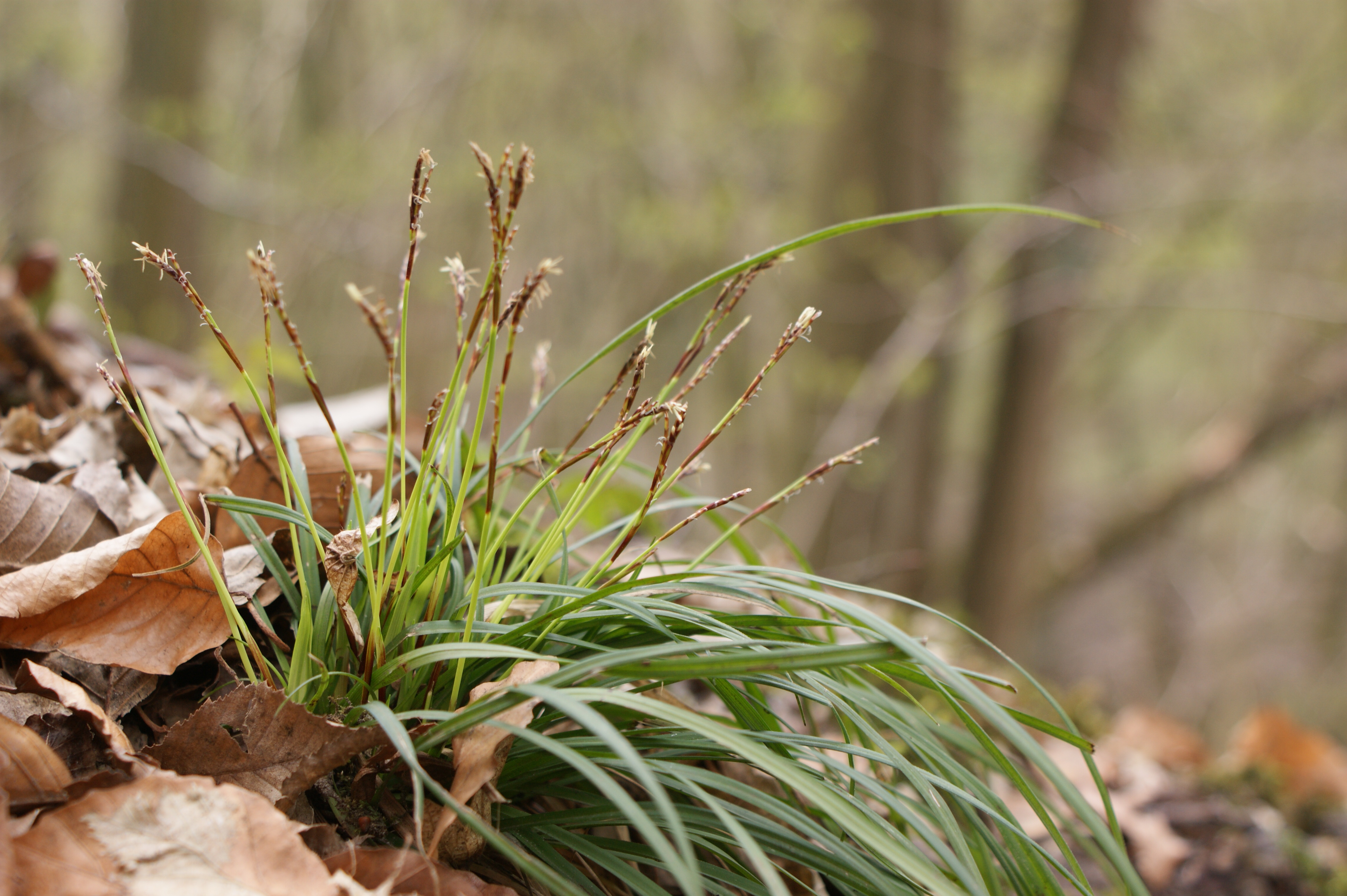

Scientific classification
- Kingdom: Plantae
- Clade: Tracheophytes
- Clade: Angiosperms
- Clade: Monocots
- Clade: Commelinids
- Order: Poales
- Family: Cyperaceae
- Genus: Carex
- Species: C. digitata

Binomial name
- Carex digitata L.

Synonyms
- List: Bitteria digitata (L.) Fedde & J.Schust.; Carex digitata var. alpina Heer; Carex ornithopoda subsp. bulgarica (Velen.) Stoeva & E.D.Popova; Trasus digitatus (L.) Gray

= Carex digitata =

Species of grass-like plant

Carex digitata, finger sedge, or fingered sedge is a species in the genus Carex, native to Europe and western Asia. It is found most often in shady, deciduous mesotrophic oak‑hornbeam forests.
