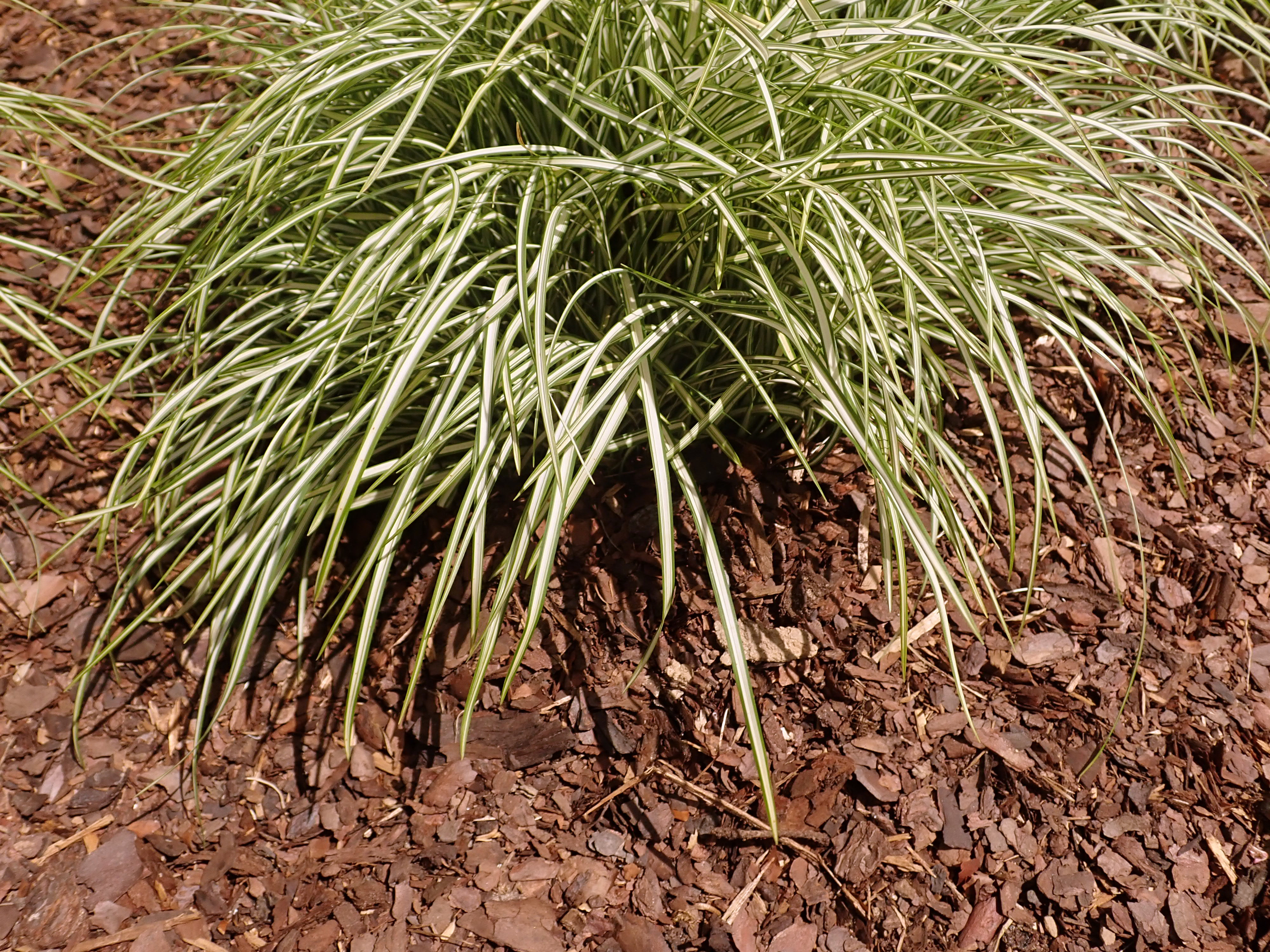
- 'Variegata' cultivar
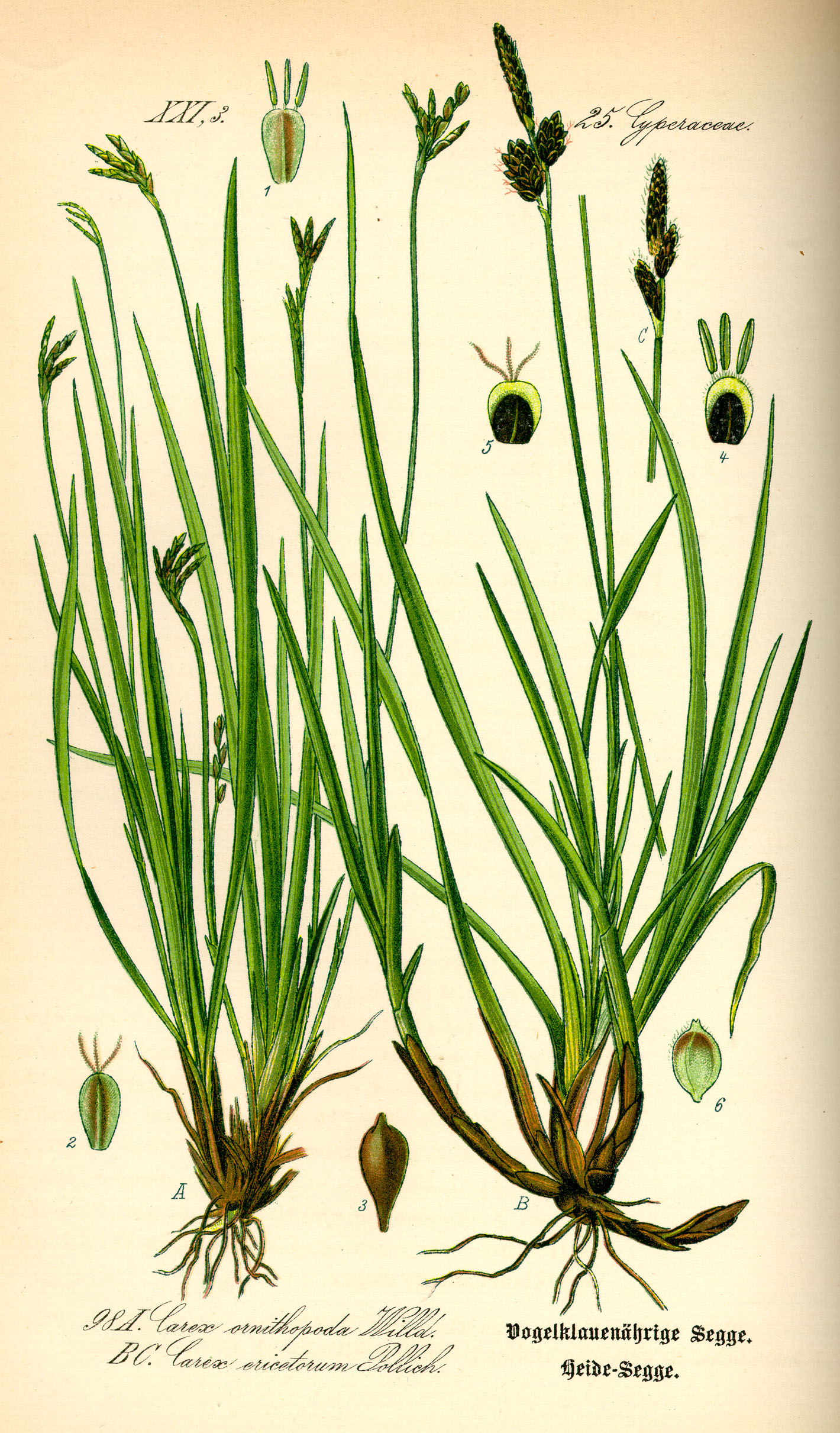
- Botanical illustration (with Carex ericetorum on right)

Scientific classification
- Kingdom: Plantae
- Clade: Tracheophytes
- Clade: Angiosperms
- Clade: Monocots
- Clade: Commelinids
- Order: Poales
- Family: Cyperaceae
- Genus: Carex
- Species: C. ornithopoda

Binomial name
- Carex ornithopoda Willd.

= Carex ornithopoda =

Species of flowering plant

Carex ornithopoda, called the bird's foot sedge, is a species of flowering plant in the genus Carex, native to most of Europe, and Anatolia. A variegated cultivar is commercially available.

== Subtaxa ==
The following subspecies are currently accepted:

- Carex ornithopoda subsp. ornithopoda
- Carex ornithopoda subsp. ornithopodioides (Hausm.) Nyman
