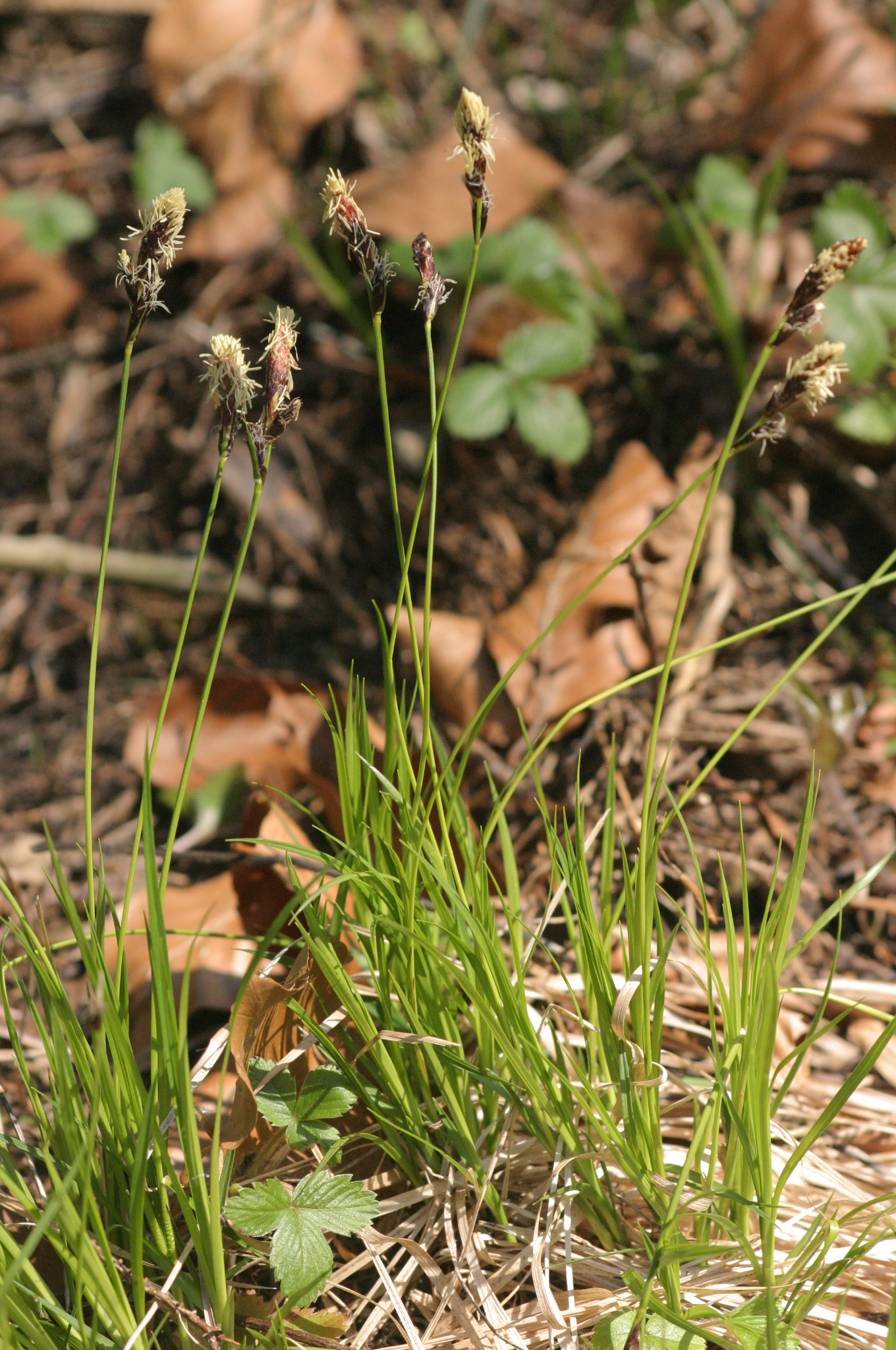

Scientific classification
- Kingdom: Plantae
- Clade: Tracheophytes
- Clade: Angiosperms
- Clade: Monocots
- Clade: Commelinids
- Order: Poales
- Family: Cyperaceae
- Genus: Carex
- Species: C. montana

Binomial name
- Carex montana Linnaeus, 1753

= Carex montana =

Species of grass-like plant

Carex montana, also called mountain or soft-leaved sedge, is a species of sedge of the genus Carex. It is most commonly found in Europe and Central Russia.

It is native to most countries in Europe including the UK, Germany, France and Spain.

It is tolerant of alkaline soils and temperatures down to −23 °C.
