= List of Lepidoptera of the Faroe Islands =

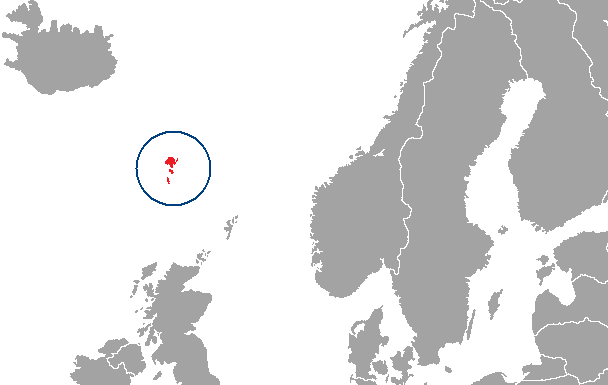
Location of the Faroe Islands

The Lepidoptera of the Faroe Islands consist of both the butterflies and moths recorded from the Faroe Islands.

According to a recent estimate, there are a total of 111 Lepidoptera species present in the Faroe Islands.

== Butterflies ==
There are no butterflies on the Faroe Islands.

== Moths ==
=== Coleophoridae ===
- Coleophora glaucicolella Wood, 1892

=== Coleophoridae ===
- Coleophora versurella Zeller, 1849

=== Crambidae ===
- Catoptria furcatellus (Zetterstedt, 1839)
- Catoptria margaritella (Denis & Schiffermuller, 1775)
- Crambus ericella (Hübner, 1813)
- Crambus pascuella (Linnaeus, 1758)
- Loxostege sticticalis (Linnaeus, 1761)
- Nomophila noctuella (Denis & Schiffermuller, 1775)
- Scoparia ambigualis (Treitschke, 1829)
- Udea ferrugalis (Hübner, 1796)
- Udea lutealis (Hübner, 1809)

=== Elachistidae ===
- Depressaria badiella (Hübner, 1796)

=== Erebidae ===
- Arctia caja (Linnaeus, 1758)
- Catocala fraxini (Linnaeus, 1758)
- Euproctis chrysorrhoea (Linnaeus, 1758)
- Scoliopteryx libatrix (Linnaeus, 1758)

=== Gelechiidae ===
- Scrobipalpa samadensis (Pfaffenzeller, 1870)

=== Geometridae ===
- Abraxas grossulariata (Linnaeus, 1758)
- Chloroclysta miata (Linnaeus, 1758)
- Chloroclysta siterata (Hufnagel, 1767)
- Dysstroma citrata (Linnaeus, 1761)
- Dysstroma truncata (Hufnagel, 1767)
- Entephria caesiata (Denis & Schiffermuller, 1775)
- Eupithecia nanata (Hübner, 1813)
- Eupithecia pusillata (Denis & Schiffermuller, 1775)
- Eupithecia satyrata (Hübner, 1813)
- Eupithecia venosata (Fabricius, 1787)
- Mesotype didymata (Linnaeus, 1758)
- Nycterosea obstipata (Fabricius, 1794)
- Operophtera brumata (Linnaeus, 1758)
- Perizoma albulata (Denis & Schiffermuller, 1775)
- Perizoma blandiata (Denis & Schiffermuller, 1775)
- Thera cognata (Thunberg, 1792)
- Xanthorhoe decoloraria (Esper, 1806)
- Xanthorhoe designata (Hufnagel, 1767)
- Xanthorhoe fluctuata (Linnaeus, 1758)

=== Gracillariidae ===
- Aspilapteryx tringipennella (Zeller, 1839)

=== Hepialidae ===
- Hepialus humuli (Linnaeus, 1758)

=== Noctuidae ===
- Agrochola circellaris (Hufnagel, 1766)
- Agrotis ipsilon (Hufnagel, 1766)
- Agrotis segetum (Denis & Schiffermuller, 1775)
- Amphipoea crinanensis (Burrows, 1908)
- Amphipoea lucens (Freyer, 1845)
- Amphipyra tragopoginis (Clerck, 1759)
- Anaplectoides prasina (Denis & Schiffermuller, 1775)
- Anarta trifolii (Hufnagel, 1766)
- Apamea crenata (Hufnagel, 1766)
- Apamea exulis (Lefebvre, 1836)
- Apamea monoglypha (Hufnagel, 1766)
- Apamea remissa (Hübner, 1809)
- Autographa gamma (Linnaeus, 1758)
- Autographa pulchrina (Haworth, 1809)
- Celaena haworthii (Curtis, 1829)
- Cerapteryx graminis (Linnaeus, 1758)
- Diarsia mendica (Fabricius, 1775)
- Enargia paleacea (Esper, 1788)
- Eupsilia transversa (Hufnagel, 1766)
- Eurois occulta (Linnaeus, 1758)
- Hada plebeja (Linnaeus, 1761)
- Helotropha leucostigma (Hübner, 1808)
- Hydraecia micacea (Esper, 1789)
- Hypocoena stigmatica (Eversmann, 1855)
- Lycophotia porphyrea (Denis & Schiffermuller, 1775)
- Mamestra brassicae (Linnaeus, 1758)
- Mesapamea secalis (Linnaeus, 1758)
- Mniotype adusta (Esper, 1790)
- Mythimna unipuncta (Haworth, 1809)
- Noctua orbona (Hufnagel, 1766)
- Noctua pronuba (Linnaeus, 1758)
- Parastichtis suspecta (Hübner, 1817)
- Peridroma saucia (Hübner, 1808)
- Phlogophora meticulosa (Linnaeus, 1758)
- Rhizedra lutosa (Hübner, 1803)
- Spodoptera exigua (Hübner, 1808)
- Standfussiana lucernea (Linnaeus, 1758)
- Trigonophora flammea (Esper, 1785)
- Xanthia icteritia (Hufnagel, 1766)
- Xestia c-nigrum (Linnaeus, 1758)
- Xestia alpicola (Zetterstedt, 1839)
- Xylena vetusta (Hübner, 1813)

=== Oecophoridae ===
- Endrosis sarcitrella (Linnaeus, 1758)
- Hofmannophila pseudospretella (Stainton, 1849)

=== Plutellidae ===
- Plutella xylostella (Linnaeus, 1758)
- Rhigognostis annulatella (Curtis, 1832)
- Rhigognostis senilella (Zetterstedt, 1839)

=== Pterophoridae ===
- Amblyptilia acanthadactyla (Hübner, 1813)
- Emmelina monodactyla (Linnaeus, 1758)
- Stenoptilia bipunctidactyla (Scopoli, 1763)

=== Pyralidae ===
- Dioryctria abietella (Denis & Schiffermuller, 1775)
- Ephestia kuehniella Zeller, 1879
- Plodia interpunctella (Hübner, 1813)

=== Sphingidae ===
- Acherontia atropos (Linnaeus, 1758)
- Agrius convolvuli (Linnaeus, 1758)
- Hyles euphorbiae (Linnaeus, 1758)
- Hyles gallii (Rottemburg, 1775)
- Hyles livornica (Esper, 1780)

=== Tineidae ===
- Monopis laevigella (Denis & Schiffermuller, 1775)
- Tinea pallescentella Stainton, 1851

=== Tortricidae ===
- Acleris aspersana (Hübner, 1817)
- Acleris comariana (Lienig & Zeller, 1846)
- Acleris maccana (Treitschke, 1835)
- Acleris notana (Donovan, 1806)
- Acleris sparsana (Denis & Schiffermuller, 1775)
- Bactra lancealana (Hübner, 1799)
- Eana osseana (Scopoli, 1763)
- Epinotia caprana (Fabricius, 1798)
- Epinotia mercuriana (Frolich, 1828)
- Epinotia solandriana (Linnaeus, 1758)
- Lobesia littoralis (Westwood & Humphreys, 1845)
- Phiaris schulziana (Fabricius, 1776)
- Zeiraphera griseana (Hübner, 1799)
