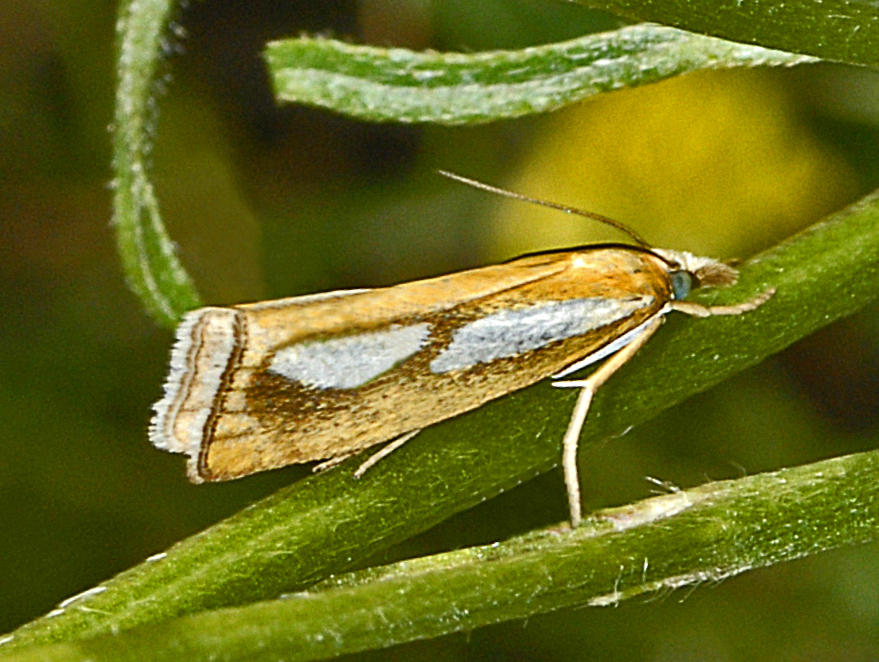
- In Turin, Italy

Scientific classification
- Kingdom: Animalia
- Phylum: Arthropoda
- Clade: Pancrustacea
- Class: Insecta
- Order: Lepidoptera
- Family: Crambidae
- Genus: Catoptria
- Species: C. conchella

Binomial name
- Catoptria conchella (Denis & Schiffermüller, 1775)

Synonyms
- Tinea conchella Denis & Schiffermüller, 1775; Catoptria atoptria conchella bourgognei Leraut, 2001; Chilo stentziellus Treitschke, 1835; Chilo conchaceus Fabricius, 1798; Chilo conchalis (Hübner, 1825); Crambus conchellus flavellus Della Beffa, 1941; Catoptria conchella pseudopauperella (Zerny, 1914)

= Catoptria conchella =

Species of moth

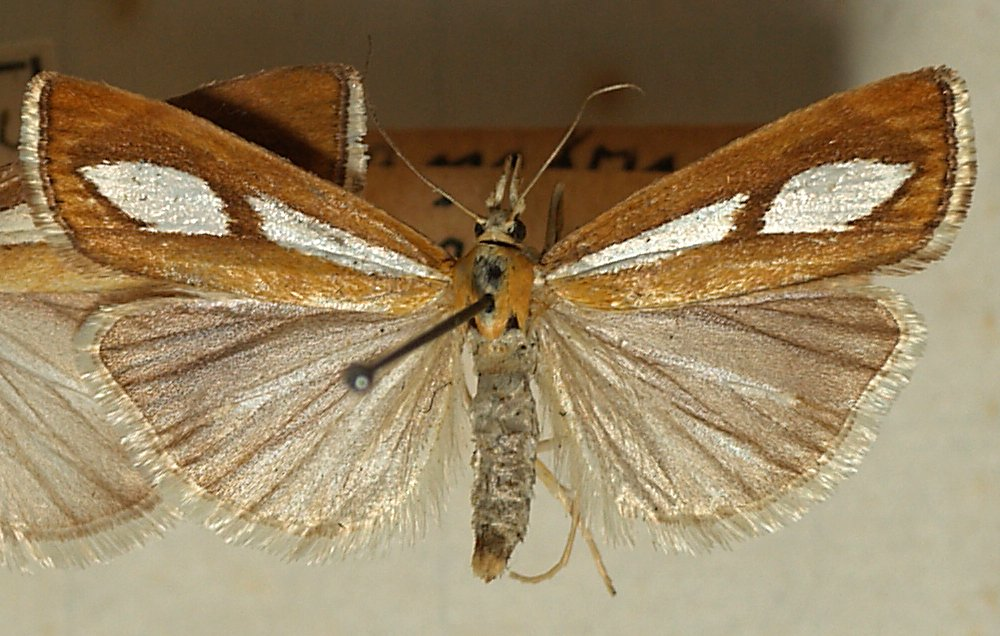
Mounted specimen

Catoptria conchella is a species of moth of the family Crambidae. It was described by Michael Denis and Ignaz Schiffermüller in 1775.

== Subspecies ==
- Catoptria conchella bourgognei Leraut, 2001
- Catoptria conchella pseudopauperella (Zerny, 1914)

== Distribution ==
This species can be found in Europe (Germany, Baltic region, Austria, France, Switzerland, Italy, Romania, Slovenia, Poland, Russia).

== Habitat ==
These moths live in the alpine meadows up to 2200 m. They mainly occur in open, grassy areas.

== Description ==
The wingspan is 24–30 mm. It is quite similar to Catoptria pinella, but the rear part of the front wing is paler and a subterminal line is missing.

== Biology ==
Caterpillars can be found from April to June. Adults fly from June to August. These moths are crepuscular.

== Bibliography ==
- Amsel, Hans Georg; Gregor, František; Reisser, Hans (Hrsg.) (1965): Microlepidoptera Palaearctica. Band 1. Crambinae. Textteil. Verlag Georg Fromme & Co, Wien, S. 277
- Bellmann, Heiko (2001): Steinbachs Naturführer. Schmetterlinge. Mosaik Verlag, München, ISBN 978-3576114579
- Patrice Leraut: Zygaenids, Pyralids 1. In: Moths of Europe. 1. Auflage. Volume III. NAP Editions, 2012, ISBN 978-2-913688-15-5, S. 550.
