= Catoptria majorellus =

Scientific classification
- Kingdom: Animalia
- Phylum: Arthropoda
- Clade: Pancrustacea
- Class: Insecta
- Order: Lepidoptera
- Family: Crambidae
- Genus: Catoptria
- Species: C. majorellus

Binomial name
- Catoptria majorellus (Drenowski, 1925)

Synonyms
- Crambus biformellus var. majorellus Drenowski, 1925; Catoptria majorella

Species of moth

Catoptria majorellus is a species of moth in the family Crambidae. It was described by Alexander Kirilow Drenowski in 1925 and is found in Bulgaria.

== Subspecies ==
Catoptria majorellus is sometimes also treated as a subspecies of Catoptria biformellus.
