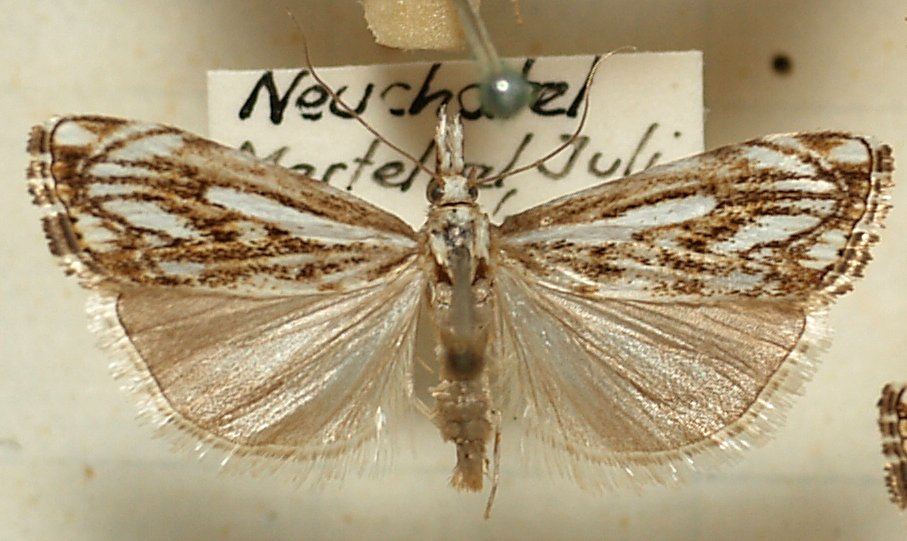

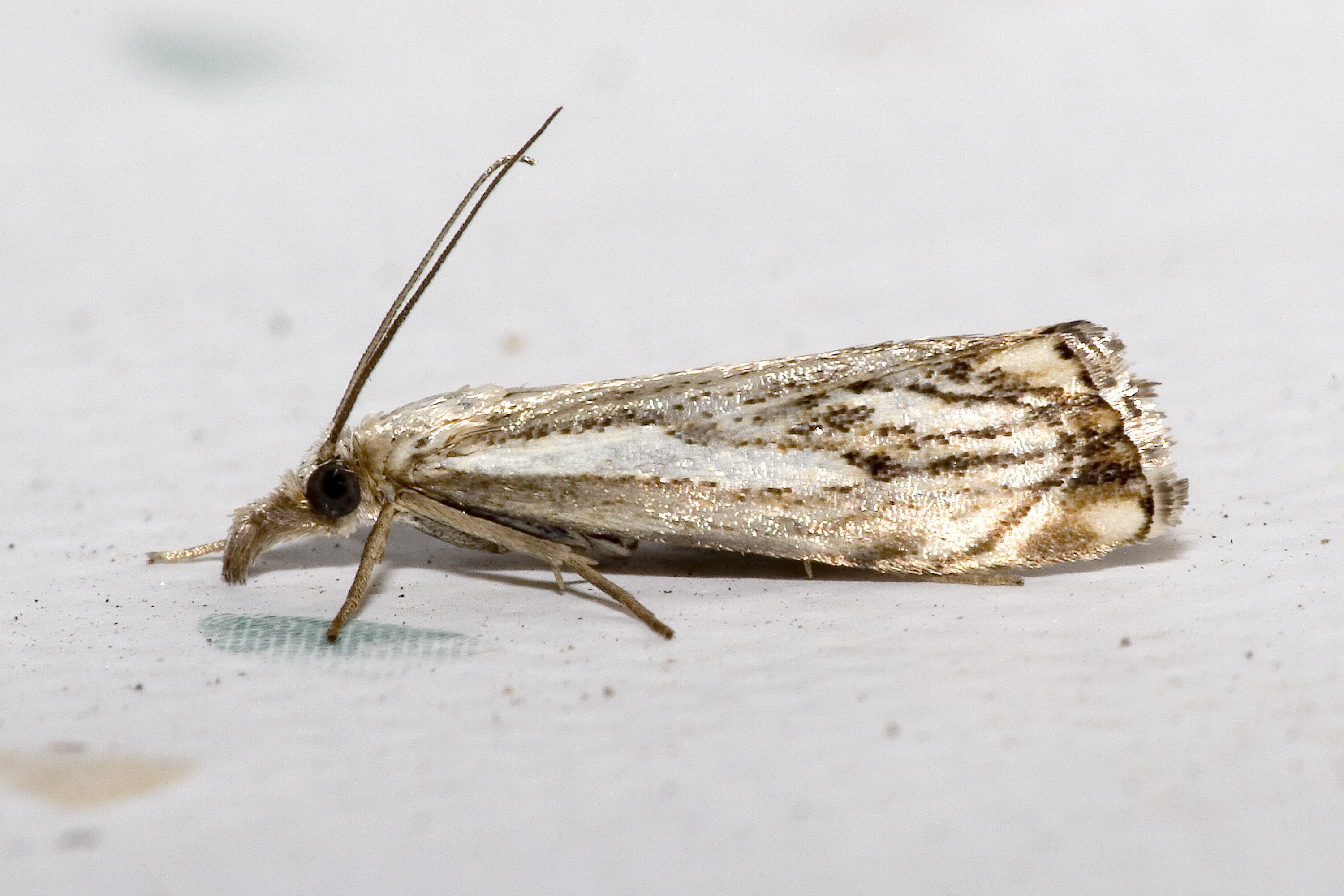

Scientific classification
- Kingdom: Animalia
- Phylum: Arthropoda
- Clade: Pancrustacea
- Class: Insecta
- Order: Lepidoptera
- Family: Crambidae
- Genus: Catoptria
- Species: C. falsella

Binomial name
- Catoptria falsella (Denis & Schiffermüller, 1775)

Synonyms
- Tinea falsella Denis & Schiffermüller, 1775; Crambus atoptria falsella neutrellus Turati, 1911; Tinea abruptella Thunberg, 1794; Palparia falsa Haworth, 1811; Argyroteuchia falsalis Hübner, 1825

= Catoptria falsella =

Species of moth

Catoptria falsella, the chequered grass-veneer, is a species of moth of the family Crambidae.

It is found in Europe. It is nocturnal.

The wingspan is 18–24 mm. (or a forewing length of 8 to 9 mm.The ground colour of the forewings is white, brown and yellowish-brown often dusted with stripes of brown. A narrow white longitudinal line extending from the base of the wing reaches past the middle of the wing. In the outer area, just before the margin, there is a strongly bulged transverse line with a point in the recess to the inner edge. The transverse line is crossed in the bulge by three thin dark longitudinal lines starting from the tip of the white longitudinal line. The hind wings are brown-grey. The caterpillars are greenish and have a brownish head and a brownish neck shield.

The moth flies from June to September depending on the location.

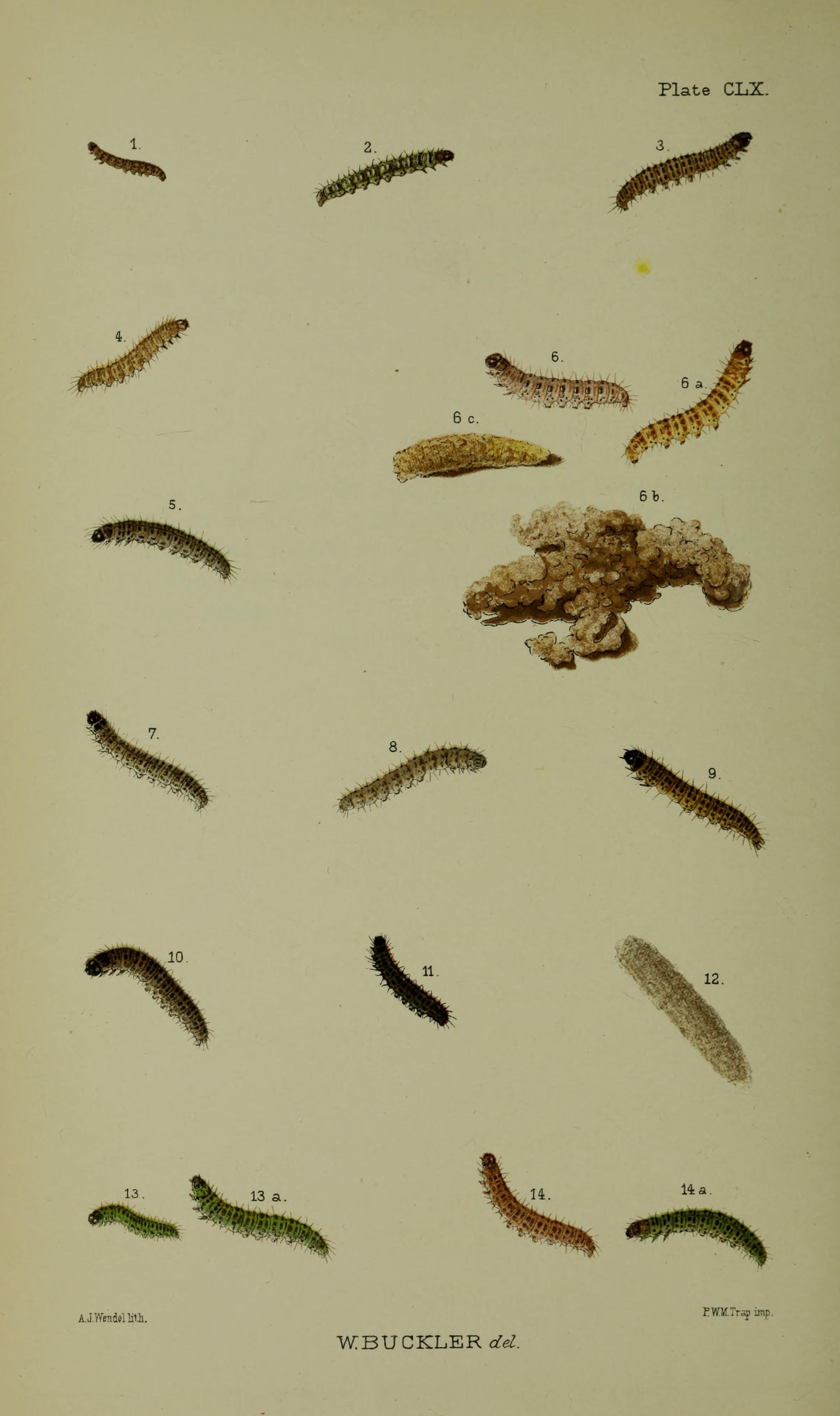
Fig. 2 larva after final moult

The larvae feed on various mosses, especially Tortula muralis.
