= Catoptria fenestratellus =

Scientific classification
- Kingdom: Animalia
- Phylum: Arthropoda
- Clade: Pancrustacea
- Class: Insecta
- Order: Lepidoptera
- Family: Crambidae
- Genus: Catoptria
- Species: C. fenestratellus

Binomial name
- Catoptria fenestratellus (Caradja, 1928)

Synonyms
- Crambus fenestratellus Caradja, 1928

Species of moth

Catoptria fenestratellus is a moth in the family Crambidae. It was described by Aristide Caradja in 1928. It is found in Altai, Russia.
