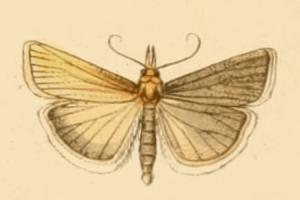

Scientific classification
- Kingdom: Animalia
- Phylum: Arthropoda
- Clade: Pancrustacea
- Class: Insecta
- Order: Lepidoptera
- Family: Crambidae
- Genus: Catoptria
- Species: C. laevigatellus

Binomial name
- Catoptria laevigatellus (Lederer, 1870)

Synonyms
- Crambus laevigatellus Lederer, 1870; Catoptria laevigatella; Crambus semicanellus Fuchs, 1903; Crambus laevigatus Hampson, 1896

= Catoptria laevigatellus =

Species of moth

Catoptria laevigatellus is a species of moth in the family Crambidae described by Julius Lederer. It is found in Bulgaria, the Caucasus, Dagestan, Transcaucasia, Armenia, north-eastern Turkey and Syria.

The wingspan is about 25 mm.
