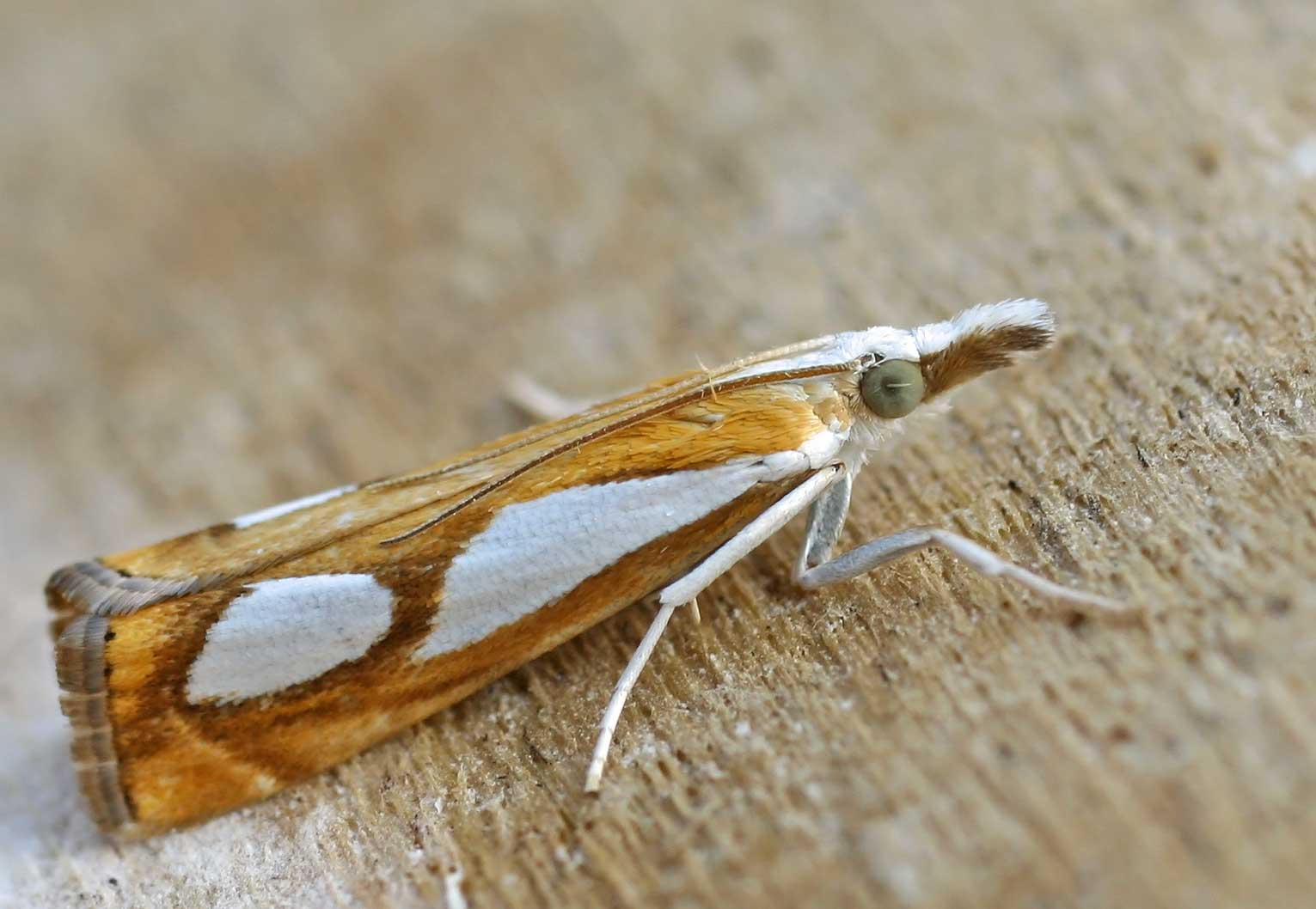
- Catoptria pinella

Scientific classification
- Domain: Eukaryota
- Kingdom: Animalia
- Phylum: Arthropoda
- Class: Insecta
- Order: Lepidoptera
- Family: Crambidae
- Tribe: Crambini
- Genus: Catoptria; Hübner, 1825

Synonyms
- Exoria Hübner, 1825; Tetrachila Hübner, 1806

= Catoptria =

Genus of moths

Catoptria is a genus of moths of the family Crambidae.

== Species ==
- Catoptria acutangulellus (Herrich-Schäffer, 1847)
- Catoptria algeriensis (Müller-Rutz, 1931)
- Catoptria amathusia Bleszynski, 1965
- Catoptria aurora Bleszynski, 1965
- Catoptria biformellus (Rebel, 1893)
- Catoptria bolivari (Agenjo, 1947)
- Catoptria brachyrhabda (Hampson in Elwes, Hampson & Durrant, 1906)
- Catoptria cabardinica Bolov, 1999
- Catoptria captiva Bassi, 1999
- Catoptria casalei Bassi, 1999
- Catoptria casperella Ganev, 1983
- Catoptria caucasicus (Alphéraky, 1876)
- Catoptria ciliciella (Rebel, 1893)
- Catoptria colchicellus (Lederer, 1870)
- Catoptria combinella (Denis & Schiffermüller, 1775)
- Catoptria conchella (Denis & Schiffermüller, 1775)
- Catoptria confusellus (Staudinger, 1881)
- Catoptria corsicellus (Duponchel, 1837)
- Catoptria daghestanica Bleszynski, 1965
- Catoptria digitellus (Herrich-Schäffer, 1849)
- Catoptria dimorphellus (Staudinger, 1881)
- Catoptria domaviellus (Rebel, 1904)
- Catoptria emiliae Savenkov, 1984
- Catoptria europaeica Bleszynski, 1965
- Catoptria falsella (Denis & Schiffermüller, 1775)
- Catoptria fenestratellus (Caradja, 1928)
- Catoptria fibigeri Ganev, 1987
- Catoptria fulgidella (Hübner, 1813)
- Catoptria furcatellus (Zetterstedt, 1839)
- Catoptria furciferalis (Hampson, 1900)
- Catoptria gozmanyi Bleszynski, 1956
- Catoptria hannemanni Alberti, 1967
- Catoptria harutai Okano, 1958
- Catoptria hilarellus (Caradja, 1925)
- Catoptria incertellus (Herrich-Schäffer, 1848)
- Catoptria inouella Bleszynski, 1965
- Catoptria kasyi Bleszynski, 1960
- Catoptria laevigatellus (Lederer, 1870)
- Catoptria languidellus (Zeller, 1863)
- Catoptria latiradiellus (Walker, 1863)
- Catoptria luctiferella (Hübner, 1813)
- Catoptria lythargyrella (Hübner, 1796)
- Catoptria maculalis (Zetterstedt, 1839)
- Catoptria majorellus (Drenowski, 1925)
- Catoptria margaritella (Denis & Schiffermüller, 1775)
- Catoptria mediofasciella (Zerny, 1914)
- Catoptria mienshani Bleszynski, 1965
- Catoptria montivaga (Inoue, 1955)
- Catoptria munroeella Bleszynski, 1965
- Catoptria myella (Hübner, 1796)
- Catoptria mytilella (Hübner, 1805)
- Catoptria nana Okano, 1959
- Catoptria olympica Ganev, 1983
- Catoptria oregonicus (Grote, 1880)
- Catoptria orientellus (Herrich-Schäffer, 1850)
- Catoptria orobiella Huemer & Tarmann, 1993
- Catoptria osthelderi (Lattin, 1950)
- Catoptria pandora Bleszynski, 1965
- Catoptria pauperellus (Treitschke, 1832)
- Catoptria permiacus (W. Petersen, 1924)
- Catoptria permutatellus (Herrich-Schäffer, 1848)
- Catoptria persephone Bleszynski, 1965
- Catoptria petrificella (Hübner, 1796)
- Catoptria pfeifferi (Osthelder, 1938)
- Catoptria pinella (Linnaeus, 1758)
- Catoptria profluxella (Christoph in Romanoff, 1887)
- Catoptria pyramidellus (Treitschke, 1832)
- Catoptria radiella (Hübner, 1813)
  - Catoptria radiella intermediellus Müller-Rutz, 1920
  - Catoptria radiella radiella Hübner, 1813
- Catoptria satakei (Okano, 1962)
- Catoptria siliciellus Rebel, 1891
- Catoptria spatulelloides Bleszynski, 1965
- Catoptria spatulellus (Turati, 1919)
- Catoptria speculalis Hübner, 1825
- Catoptria spodiellus (Rebel, 1916)
- Catoptria staudingeri (Zeller, 1863)
- Catoptria submontivaga Bleszynski, 1965
- Catoptria thibetica Bleszynski, 1965
- Catoptria trichostomus (Christoph, 1858)
- Catoptria verellus (Zincken, 1817)
- Catoptria viridiana Bleszynski, 1965
- Catoptria witimella Bleszynski, 1965
- Catoptria xerxes (Sauber, 1904)
- Catoptria zermattensis (Frey, 1870)
