= Catoptria siliciellus =

Scientific classification
- Kingdom: Animalia
- Phylum: Arthropoda
- Clade: Pancrustacea
- Class: Insecta
- Order: Lepidoptera
- Family: Crambidae
- Genus: Catoptria
- Species: C. siliciellus

Binomial name
- Catoptria siliciellus (Rebel, 1893)

Synonyms
- Crambus siliciellus Rebel, 1893; Catoptria siliciella; Catoptria ciliciellus; Catoptria ciliciella

Species of moth

Catoptria siliciellus is a species of moth in the family Crambidae described by Hans Rebel in 18913. It is found in Bulgaria, Asia Minor, Iran (Larestan) and Transcaucasia.

The wingspan is 27–30 mm.
