= Catoptria orientellus =

Scientific classification
- Kingdom: Animalia
- Phylum: Arthropoda
- Clade: Pancrustacea
- Class: Insecta
- Order: Lepidoptera
- Family: Crambidae
- Genus: Catoptria
- Species: C. orientellus

Binomial name
- Catoptria orientellus (Herrich-Schaffer, 1850)

Synonyms
- Crambus orientellus Herrich-Schaffer, 1850; Catoptria orientella

Species of moth

Catoptria orientellus is a species of moth in the family Crambidae. It is found in Romania.
