= Catoptria mediofasciella =

Scientific classification
- Kingdom: Animalia
- Phylum: Arthropoda
- Clade: Pancrustacea
- Class: Insecta
- Order: Lepidoptera
- Family: Crambidae
- Genus: Catoptria
- Species: C. mediofasciella

Binomial name
- Catoptria mediofasciella (Zerny, 1914)

Synonyms
- Crambus mediofasciella Zerny, 1914

Species of moth

Catoptria mediofasciella is a moth in the family Crambidae. It was described by Hans Zerny in 1914. It is found in Armenia.
