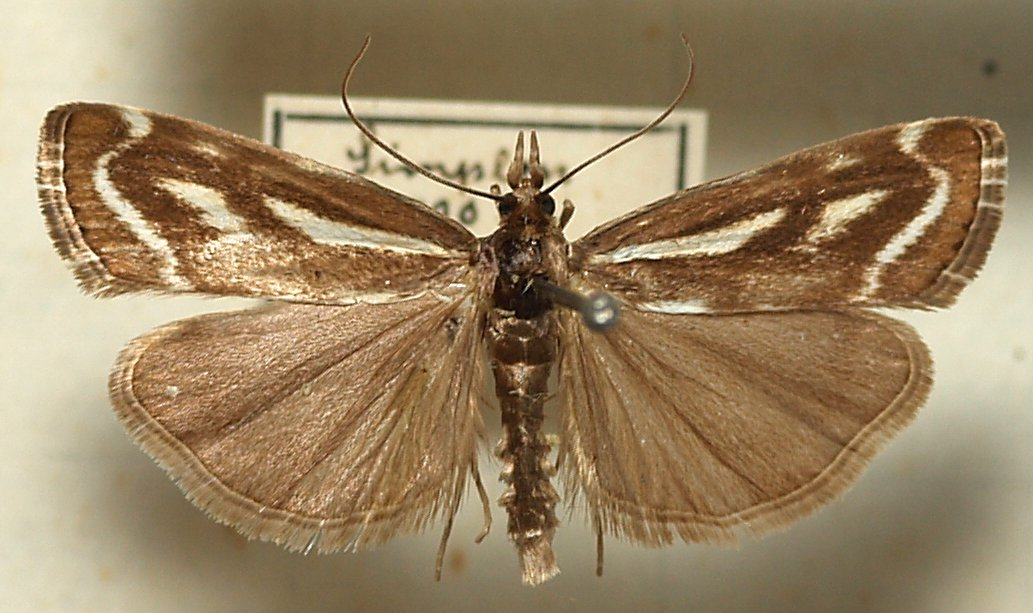

Scientific classification
- Kingdom: Animalia
- Phylum: Arthropoda
- Clade: Pancrustacea
- Class: Insecta
- Order: Lepidoptera
- Family: Crambidae
- Genus: Catoptria
- Species: C. luctiferella

Binomial name
- Catoptria luctiferella (Hübner, 1813)

Synonyms
- Tinea luctiferella Hübner, 1813; Crambus italellus A. Costa, 1888; Catoptria luctiferella luctuellus (Herrich-Schäffer, [1855]); Catoptria luctiferella meridialpina Burmann, 1975; Crambus luctiferellus f. atrellus Burmann, 1951; Crambus luctiferellus f. butyrellus Weber, 1945; Crambus luctiferellus f. griseellus Burmann, 1951; Crambus luctiferellus f. reductellus Burmann, 1951; Crambus luctiferellus var. heeriellus Zeller, 1863; Crambus luctuellus f. fumellus Burmann, 1951; Crambus luctuellus f. lineellus Burmann, 1951; Crambus luctuellus var. nigricellus Krone, 1911

= Catoptria luctiferella =

Species of moth

Catoptria luctiferella is a species of moth of the family Crambidae. It is found in Europe.
