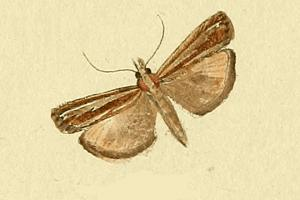

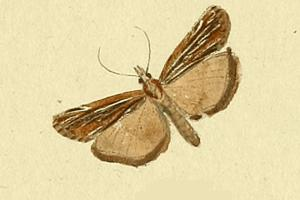

Scientific classification
- Kingdom: Animalia
- Phylum: Arthropoda
- Clade: Pancrustacea
- Class: Insecta
- Order: Lepidoptera
- Family: Crambidae
- Genus: Catoptria
- Species: C. fulgidella

Binomial name
- Catoptria fulgidella (Hubner, 1813)

Synonyms
- Tinea fulgidella Hübner, 1813; Eucarphia fulgidalis Hübner, 1825

= Catoptria fulgidella =

Species of moth

Catoptria fulgidella is a species of moth in the family Crambidae described by Jacob Hübner in 1813. It is found in most of Europe, except Ireland, Great Britain, Ukraine, Slovenia, Croatia and Bulgaria.

The wingspan is 22–29 mm. Adults have been recorded from June to August.

The larvae feed on Carex (including Carex arenaria), Gnaphalium (including Gnaphalium dicicum) and possibly Antennaria and Festuca species.
