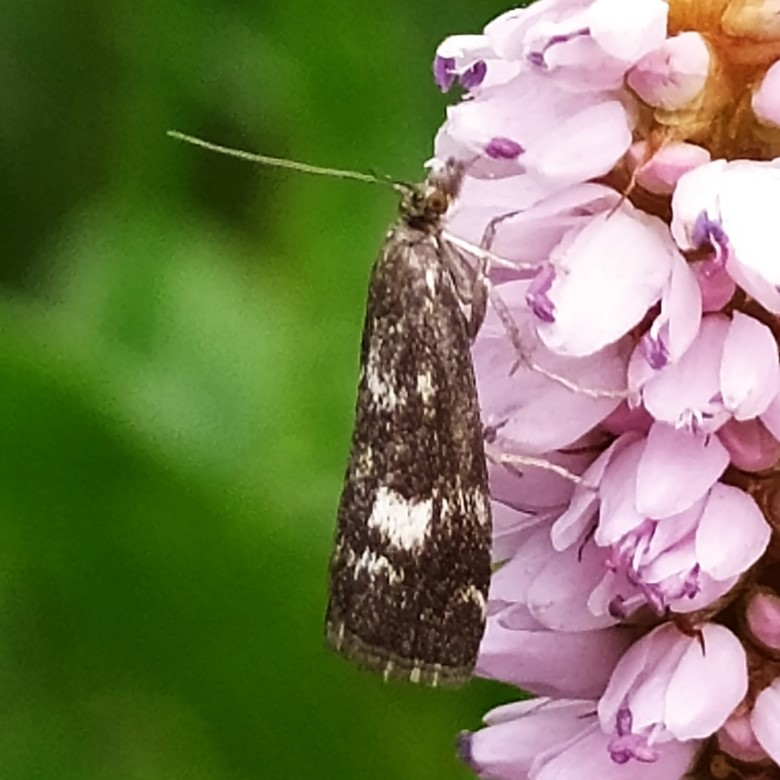

Scientific classification
- Kingdom: Animalia
- Phylum: Arthropoda
- Clade: Pancrustacea
- Class: Insecta
- Order: Lepidoptera
- Family: Crambidae
- Genus: Catoptria
- Species: C. maculalis

Binomial name
- Catoptria maculalis (Zetterstedt, 1839)

Synonyms
- Scopula maculalis Zetterstedt, 1839; Crambus cacuminellus Zeller, 1850; Crambus maculalis ab. albimaculella Burmann, 1948; Crambus maculalis ab. albisignata Burmann, 1948

= Catoptria maculalis =

Species of moth

Catoptria maculalis is a species of moth in the family Crambidae. It is found in Germany, Poland, Czech Republic, Slovakia, Switzerland, Austria, Italy, Fennoscandia, Russia, and Canada (Quebec, Labrador and the Yukon).

The moth's wingspan is 18–23 mm. Adults are on wing in July in North America and in June and July in northern Europe.
