= Catoptria hilarellus =

Scientific classification
- Kingdom: Animalia
- Phylum: Arthropoda
- Clade: Pancrustacea
- Class: Insecta
- Order: Lepidoptera
- Family: Crambidae
- Genus: Catoptria
- Species: C. hilarellus

Binomial name
- Catoptria hilarellus (Caradja, 1925)

Synonyms
- Crambus hilarellus Caradja, 1925

Species of moth

Catoptria hilarellus is a moth in the family Crambidae. It was described by Aristide Caradja in 1925. It is found in Taurus Mountains of Turkey.
