= Catoptria montivaga =

Scientific classification
- Kingdom: Animalia
- Phylum: Arthropoda
- Clade: Pancrustacea
- Class: Insecta
- Order: Lepidoptera
- Family: Crambidae
- Genus: Catoptria
- Species: C. montivaga

Binomial name
- Catoptria montivaga (Inoue, 1955)

Synonyms
- Crambus montivagus Inoue, 1955; Catoptria montivagus

Species of moth

Catoptria montivaga is a moth in the family Crambidae. It was described by Inoue in 1955. It is found in Japan (Honshu).
