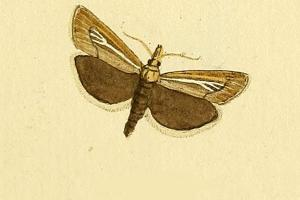

Scientific classification
- Kingdom: Animalia
- Phylum: Arthropoda
- Clade: Pancrustacea
- Class: Insecta
- Order: Lepidoptera
- Family: Crambidae
- Genus: Catoptria
- Species: C. petrificella

Binomial name
- Catoptria petrificella (Hubner, 1796)

Synonyms
- Tinea petrificella Hubner, 1796; Crambus coulonellus Duponchel, [1837]; Crambus taeniellus Zeller, 1839

= Catoptria petrificella =

Species of moth

Catoptria petrificella is a species of moth in the family Crambidae. It is found in large parts of Europe, except Ireland, Great Britain, Denmark, Fennoscandia, the Baltic region, the Benelux, Hungary, Greece and Portugal.
