= Catoptria languidellus =

Scientific classification
- Kingdom: Animalia
- Phylum: Arthropoda
- Clade: Pancrustacea
- Class: Insecta
- Order: Lepidoptera
- Family: Crambidae
- Genus: Catoptria
- Species: C. languidellus

Binomial name
- Catoptria languidellus (Zeller, 1863)

Synonyms
- Crambus languidellus Zeller, 1863; Catoptria languidella

Species of moth

Catoptria languidellus is a species of moth in the family Crambidae described by Philipp Christoph Zeller in 1863. It is found in Italy, Switzerland, Austria, the Balkan Peninsula, the Caucasus, Transcaucasia, Armenia and Central Asia (Tannuola, Minussinsk, Ala-Tau).
