= Catoptria fibigeri =

Scientific classification
- Kingdom: Animalia
- Phylum: Arthropoda
- Clade: Pancrustacea
- Class: Insecta
- Order: Lepidoptera
- Family: Crambidae
- Genus: Catoptria
- Species: C. fibigeri

Binomial name
- Catoptria fibigeri Ganev, 1987

Species of moth

Catoptria fibigeri is a species of moth in the family Crambidae. It is found in Greece.
