= Catoptria biformellus =

Scientific classification
- Kingdom: Animalia
- Phylum: Arthropoda
- Clade: Pancrustacea
- Class: Insecta
- Order: Lepidoptera
- Family: Crambidae
- Genus: Catoptria
- Species: C. biformellus

Binomial name
- Catoptria biformellus (Rebel, 1893)

Synonyms
- Crambus biformellus Rebel, 1893; Catoptria biformellus klimeschi Ganev, 1983; Catoptria biformellus roesleri Ganev, 1983

Species of moth

Catoptria biformellus is a species of moth in the family Crambidae described by Hans Rebel in 1893. It is found in Bulgaria and Transcaucasia.

The wingspan is 24–26 mm.

== Subspecies ==
- Catoptria biformellus biformellus
- Catoptria biformellus klimeschi Ganev, 1983 (Bulgaria)

Catoptria majorellus is sometimes also treated as a subspecies of Catoptria biformellus.
