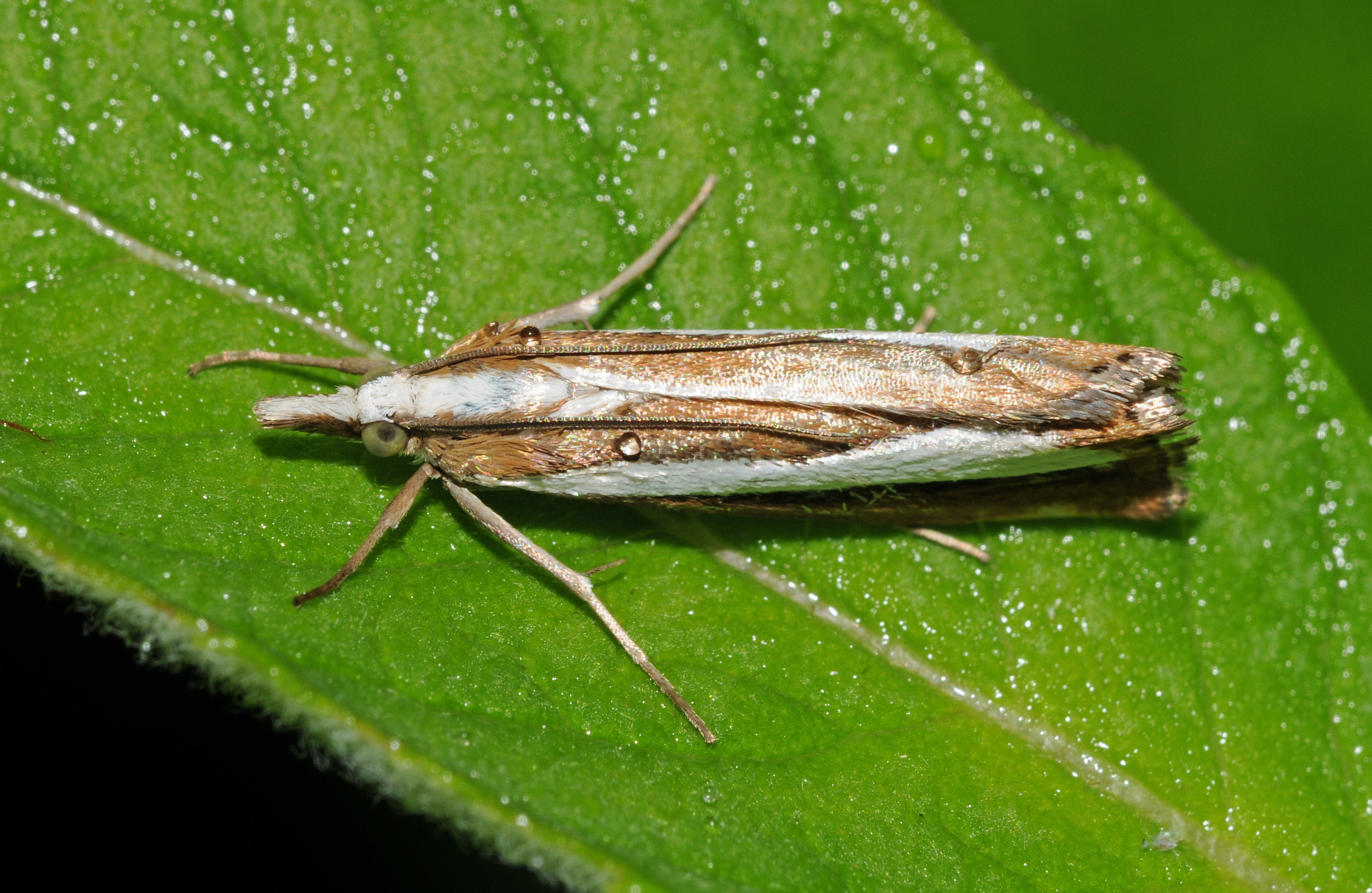

Scientific classification
- Kingdom: Animalia
- Phylum: Arthropoda
- Clade: Pancrustacea
- Class: Insecta
- Order: Lepidoptera
- Family: Crambidae
- Genus: Catoptria
- Species: C. pyramidellus

Binomial name
- Catoptria pyramidellus (Treitschke, 1832)

Synonyms
- Chilo pyramidellus Treitschke, 1832; Chilo cuneellus Treitschke, 1835; Crambus adamantellus Guenée, 1845; Catoptria pyramidella

= Catoptria pyramidellus =

Species of moth

Catoptria pyramidellus is a species of moth in the family Crambidae. It is found in France, Germany, Austria, Switzerland, Italy, Slovenia and Bulgaria.
