= Catoptria caucasicus =

Scientific classification
- Kingdom: Animalia
- Phylum: Arthropoda
- Clade: Pancrustacea
- Class: Insecta
- Order: Lepidoptera
- Family: Crambidae
- Genus: Catoptria
- Species: C. caucasicus

Binomial name
- Catoptria caucasicus (Alphéraky, 1876)

Synonyms
- Crambus caucasicus Alphéraky, 1876; Catoptria caucasica

Species of moth

Catoptria caucasicus is a species of moth in the family Crambidae described by Sergei Alphéraky in 1876. It is found in the northern Caucasus.
