= Catoptria harutai =

Scientific classification
- Kingdom: Animalia
- Phylum: Arthropoda
- Clade: Pancrustacea
- Class: Insecta
- Order: Lepidoptera
- Family: Crambidae
- Genus: Catoptria
- Species: C. harutai

Binomial name
- Catoptria harutai Okano, 1958

Species of moth

Catoptria harutai is a moth in the family Crambidae. It was described by Okano in 1958. It is found in Japan (Honshu).
