= Catoptria xerxes =

Scientific classification
- Kingdom: Animalia
- Phylum: Arthropoda
- Clade: Pancrustacea
- Class: Insecta
- Order: Lepidoptera
- Family: Crambidae
- Genus: Catoptria
- Species: C. xerxes

Binomial name
- Catoptria xerxes (Sauber, 1904)

Synonyms
- Crambus xerxes Sauber, 1904

Species of moth

Catoptria xerxes is a moth in the family Crambidae. It was described by Sauber in 1904. It is found in China (Xinjiang).
