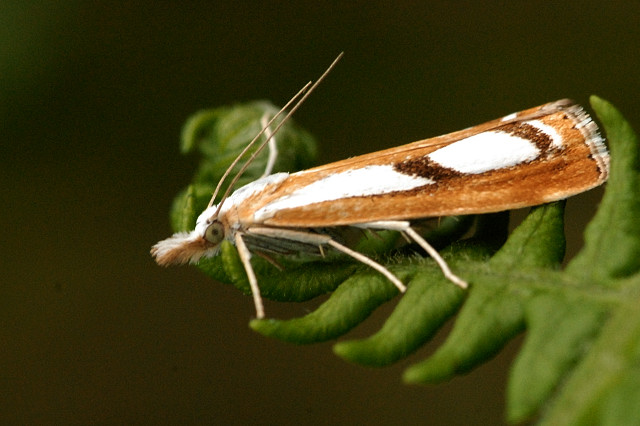

Scientific classification
- Kingdom: Animalia
- Phylum: Arthropoda
- Clade: Pancrustacea
- Class: Insecta
- Order: Lepidoptera
- Family: Crambidae
- Genus: Catoptria
- Species: C. permutatellus

Binomial name
- Catoptria permutatellus (Herrich-Schäffer, 1848)

Synonyms
- Catoptria permutatella; Crambus permutatellus Herrich-Schäffer, 1848; Catoptria permutatella f. robertispeculum Réal, 1988; Crambus hercyniae Heinemann, 1854; Crambus uralensis W. Petersen, 1924; Catoptria permutatellus kaisilai (Lattin, 1951)

= Catoptria permutatellus =

Species of moth

Catoptria permutatellus is a species of moth of the family Crambidae. It is found in Europe. The imago can only be distinguished from Catoptria osthelderi by microscopic research of the genitalia.

The wingspan is 22–29 mm. The moth flies from May to August depending on the location.

The larvae feed on various mosses.
