= Catoptria trichostomus =

Scientific classification
- Kingdom: Animalia
- Phylum: Arthropoda
- Clade: Pancrustacea
- Class: Insecta
- Order: Lepidoptera
- Family: Crambidae
- Genus: Catoptria
- Species: C. trichostomus

Binomial name
- Catoptria trichostomus (Christoph, 1858)

Synonyms
- Crambus trichostomus Christoph, 1858; Catoptria tristis Kirpichnikova, 1994; Eudorea albisinuatella albisinuatella Packard, 1867

Species of moth

Catoptria trichostomus is a moth in the family Crambidae. It was described by Hugo Theodor Christoph in 1858. It is found in North America, where it has been recorded from Alaska to Labrador and Baffin Island in the Northwest Territories, south in the Rocky Mountains to southern Alberta. It is also found in the Russian Far East. The habitat consists of coniferous forests.

The wingspan is 17–20 mm.
