= Catoptria captiva =

Scientific classification
- Kingdom: Animalia
- Phylum: Arthropoda
- Clade: Pancrustacea
- Class: Insecta
- Order: Lepidoptera
- Family: Crambidae
- Genus: Catoptria
- Species: C. captiva

Binomial name
- Catoptria captiva Bassi, 1999

Species of moth

Catoptria captiva is a species of moth in the family Crambidae. It is found in Bosnia and Herzegovina.
