= Catoptria olympica =

Scientific classification
- Kingdom: Animalia
- Phylum: Arthropoda
- Clade: Pancrustacea
- Class: Insecta
- Order: Lepidoptera
- Family: Crambidae
- Genus: Catoptria
- Species: C. olympica

Binomial name
- Catoptria olympica Ganev, 1983

Species of moth

Catoptria olympica is a species of moth in the family Crambidae. It is found in Bulgaria and Greece.
