= Catoptria staudingeri =

Scientific classification
- Kingdom: Animalia
- Phylum: Arthropoda
- Clade: Pancrustacea
- Class: Insecta
- Order: Lepidoptera
- Family: Crambidae
- Genus: Catoptria
- Species: C. staudingeri

Binomial name
- Catoptria staudingeri (Zeller, 1863)

Synonyms
- Crambus staudingeri Zeller, 1863; Crambus cuneolellus Chrétien, 1898

Species of moth

Catoptria staudingeri is a species of moth in the family Crambidae described by Philipp Christoph Zeller in 1863. It is found in France, Spain, Portugal and on Sicily.

The wingspan is about 19 mm.

The larvae feed on moss species.
