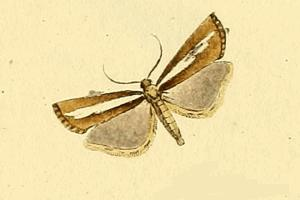
- Catoptria radiella radiella
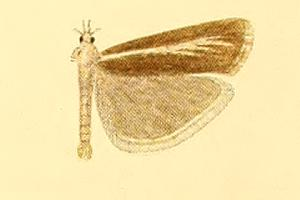
- Catoptria radiella intermediellus

Scientific classification
- Kingdom: Animalia
- Phylum: Arthropoda
- Clade: Pancrustacea
- Class: Insecta
- Order: Lepidoptera
- Family: Crambidae
- Genus: Catoptria
- Species: C. radiella

Binomial name
- Catoptria radiella (Hubner, 1813)

Synonyms
- Tinea radiella Hubner, 1813; Crambus radiellus var. roccaellus Della Beffa, 1941; Crambus radiella intermediellus Müller-Rutz, 1920; Catoptria radiella jordankiella Ganev, 1981; Eucarphia radialis Hübner, 1825; Crambus radiella tristrigellus Ragonot, 1875; Crambus radiellus tatricellus Bleszynski, 1955

= Catoptria radiella =

Species of moth

Catoptria radiella is a species of moth in the family Crambidae. It is found in France, Italy, Poland and Romania.

The length of the forewings is 12–13 mm.

== Subspecies ==
- Catoptria radiella radiella (Alps)
- Catoptria radiella intermediellus (Müller-Rutz, 1920) (Basses Alpes, Alpes-Maritimes, Apennines)
- Catoptria radiella tristrigellus (Ragonot, 1875) (Switzerland, Tatra Mountains)
