= Catoptria spatulelloides =

Scientific classification
- Kingdom: Animalia
- Phylum: Arthropoda
- Clade: Pancrustacea
- Class: Insecta
- Order: Lepidoptera
- Family: Crambidae
- Genus: Catoptria
- Species: C. spatulelloides

Binomial name
- Catoptria spatulelloides Bleszynski, 1965

Synonyms
- Catoptria parenzani Hartig, 1972

Species of moth

Catoptria spatulelloides is a species of moth in the family Crambidae. It is found in Italy.
