= Catoptria algeriensis =

Scientific classification
- Kingdom: Animalia
- Phylum: Arthropoda
- Clade: Pancrustacea
- Class: Insecta
- Order: Lepidoptera
- Family: Crambidae
- Genus: Catoptria
- Species: C. algeriensis

Binomial name
- Catoptria algeriensis (Müller-Rutz, 1931)

Synonyms
- Crambus algeriensis Müller-Rutz, 1931

Species of moth

Catoptria algeriensis is a moth in the family Crambidae. It was described by Johann Müller-Rutz in 1931. It is found in Algeria.
