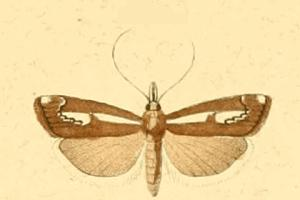

Scientific classification
- Kingdom: Animalia
- Phylum: Arthropoda
- Clade: Pancrustacea
- Class: Insecta
- Order: Lepidoptera
- Family: Crambidae
- Genus: Catoptria
- Species: C. corsicellus

Binomial name
- Catoptria corsicellus (Duponchel, 1836)

Synonyms
- Crambus corsicellus Duponchel, 1836; Catoptria corsicella

= Catoptria corsicellus =

Species of moth

Catoptria corsicellus is a species of moth in the family Crambidae described by Philogène Auguste Joseph Duponchel in 1836. It is found on Corsica and Sardinia.
