= Catoptria zermattensis =

Scientific classification
- Kingdom: Animalia
- Phylum: Arthropoda
- Clade: Pancrustacea
- Class: Insecta
- Order: Lepidoptera
- Family: Crambidae
- Genus: Catoptria
- Species: C. zermattensis

Binomial name
- Catoptria zermattensis (Frey, 1870)

Synonyms
- Crambus zermattensis Frey, 1870; Crambus zermattensis f. müller-rutzi Wehrli, 1924

Species of moth

Catoptria zermattensis is a species of moth in the family Crambidae. It is found in France, Switzerland and Italy.
