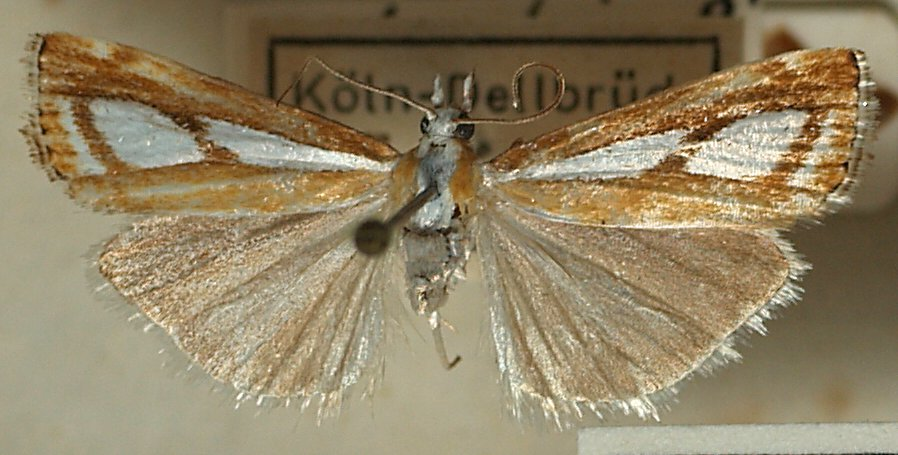

Scientific classification
- Kingdom: Animalia
- Phylum: Arthropoda
- Clade: Pancrustacea
- Class: Insecta
- Order: Lepidoptera
- Family: Crambidae
- Genus: Catoptria
- Species: C. osthelderi

Binomial name
- Catoptria osthelderi (de Lattin, 1950)

Synonyms
- Crambus osthelderi Lattin, 1950

= Catoptria osthelderi =

Species of moth

Catoptria osthelderi is a species of moth of the family Crambidae described by Gustave de Lattin in 1950. It is found in Europe. The imago can only be distinguished from Catoptria permutatellus by microscopic examination of the genitalia.

The wingspan is 22–29 mm. The moth flies from June to September depending on the location.

The larvae feed on various mosses.
