= Catoptria dimorphellus =

Scientific classification
- Kingdom: Animalia
- Phylum: Arthropoda
- Clade: Pancrustacea
- Class: Insecta
- Order: Lepidoptera
- Family: Crambidae
- Genus: Catoptria
- Species: C. dimorphellus

Binomial name
- Catoptria dimorphellus (Staudinger, 1882)

Synonyms
- Crambus dimorphellus Staudinger, 1882; Catoptria dimorphella; Catoptria wolfi Ganev & Hacker, 1984; Crambus aetnellus Zerny, 1943; Crambus haywardi Rebel, 1939

Species of moth

Catoptria dimorphellus is a species of moth in the family Crambidae described by Otto Staudinger in 1882. It is found in Spain, Greece and on Sicily , as well as in Turkey and Syria.
