= Catoptria inouella =

Scientific classification
- Kingdom: Animalia
- Phylum: Arthropoda
- Clade: Pancrustacea
- Class: Insecta
- Order: Lepidoptera
- Family: Crambidae
- Genus: Catoptria
- Species: C. inouella

Binomial name
- Catoptria inouella Błeszyński, 1965

Species of moth

Catoptria inouella is a moth in the family Crambidae. It was described by Stanisław Błeszyński in 1965. It is found in Honshu, Japan.
