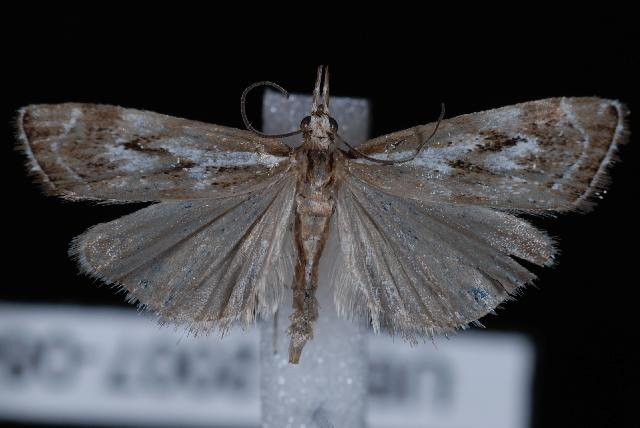

Scientific classification
- Kingdom: Animalia
- Phylum: Arthropoda
- Clade: Pancrustacea
- Class: Insecta
- Order: Lepidoptera
- Family: Crambidae
- Genus: Catoptria
- Species: C. oregonicus

Binomial name
- Catoptria oregonicus (Grote, 1880)

Synonyms
- Crambus oregonicus Grote, 1880; Catoptria oregonica; Crambus bartellus Barnes & McDunnough, 1918

= Catoptria oregonicus =

Species of moth

Catoptria oregonicus, the western catoptria or Oregon catoptria moth, is a moth in the family Crambidae. It was described by Augustus Radcliffe Grote in 1880. It is found in North America, where it has been recorded from British Columbia and Alberta to Montana, Oregon and northern coastal California. The habitat consists of meadows in the mountains and foothills.

The wingspan is 17–21 mm. Adults are on wing from July to early September.
