= Catoptria gozmanyi =

Scientific classification
- Kingdom: Animalia
- Phylum: Arthropoda
- Clade: Pancrustacea
- Class: Insecta
- Order: Lepidoptera
- Family: Crambidae
- Genus: Catoptria
- Species: C. gozmanyi

Binomial name
- Catoptria gozmanyi Bleszynski, 1956

Species of moth

Catoptria gozmanyi is a species of moth in the family Crambidae. It is found in Romania, Bulgaria, North Macedonia, Greece and Italy.
