= Catoptria furciferalis =

Scientific classification
- Kingdom: Animalia
- Phylum: Arthropoda
- Clade: Pancrustacea
- Class: Insecta
- Order: Lepidoptera
- Family: Crambidae
- Genus: Catoptria
- Species: C. furciferalis

Binomial name
- Catoptria furciferalis (Hampson, 1900)

Synonyms
- Crambus furciferalis Hampson, 1900

Species of moth

Catoptria furciferalis is a moth in the family Crambidae. It was described by George Hampson in 1900. It is found in Russia (Ussuri).
