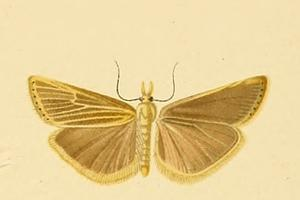

Scientific classification
- Kingdom: Animalia
- Phylum: Arthropoda
- Clade: Pancrustacea
- Class: Insecta
- Order: Lepidoptera
- Family: Crambidae
- Genus: Catoptria
- Species: C. domaviellus

Binomial name
- Catoptria domaviellus (Rebel, 1904)

Synonyms
- Crambus lithargyrellus var. domaviellus Rebel, 1904; Catoptria domaviella

= Catoptria domaviellus =

Species of moth

Catoptria domaviellus is a species of moth in the family Crambidae described by Hans Rebel in 1904. It is found in Bosnia and Herzegovina, Serbia and Montenegro, the Republic of Macedonia and Bulgaria.
