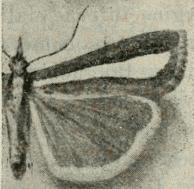

Scientific classification
- Kingdom: Animalia
- Phylum: Arthropoda
- Clade: Pancrustacea
- Class: Insecta
- Order: Lepidoptera
- Family: Crambidae
- Genus: Catoptria
- Species: C. spatulellus

Binomial name
- Catoptria spatulellus (Turati, 1919)

Synonyms
- Crambus spatulellus Turati, 1919; Catoptria spatulella

= Catoptria spatulellus =

Species of moth

Catoptria spatulellus is a species of moth in the family Crambidae described by Turati in 1919. It is found in the Apennines of Italy.
