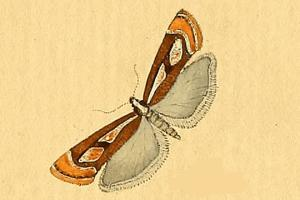

Scientific classification
- Kingdom: Animalia
- Phylum: Arthropoda
- Clade: Pancrustacea
- Class: Insecta
- Order: Lepidoptera
- Family: Crambidae
- Genus: Catoptria
- Species: C. mytilella

Binomial name
- Catoptria mytilella (Hubner, 1805)

Synonyms
- Tinea mytilella Hubner, 1805; Crambus villarubiae Agenjo, 1954; Catoptria mytilella hermesi (Ganev, 1987); Crambus mitylellus Duponchel, 1836; Catoptria mytilalis Hübner, 1825; Crambus mytilella vilarrubiae Agenjo, 1954

= Catoptria mytilella =

Species of moth

Catoptria mytilella is a species of moth in the family Crambidae described by Jacob Hübner in 1805. It is found in large parts of Europe (except Ireland, Great Britain, the Netherlands, Fennoscandia, Denmark, the Baltic region, Ukraine and Portugal), Asia Minor and the northern Caucasus.

The wingspan is 17–25 mm. Adults are on wing from mid-June to late July in one generation per year.

The larvae possibly feed on mosses.

== Subspecies ==
- Catoptria mytilella mytilella
- Catoptria mytilella vilarrubiae (Agenjo, 1954) (Spain)
