= Catoptria brachyrhabda =

Scientific classification
- Kingdom: Animalia
- Phylum: Arthropoda
- Clade: Pancrustacea
- Class: Insecta
- Order: Lepidoptera
- Family: Crambidae
- Genus: Catoptria
- Species: C. brachyrhabda

Binomial name
- Catoptria brachyrhabda (Hampson in Elwes, Hampson & Durrant, 1906)

Synonyms
- Crambus brachyrhabda Hampson in Elwes, Hampson & Durrant, 1906; Crambus brachyrabda Błeszyński & Collins, 1962

Species of moth

Catoptria brachyrhabda is a moth in the family Crambidae. It was described by George Hampson in 1906. It is found in Sikkim, India.
