= Catoptria bolivari =

Scientific classification
- Kingdom: Animalia
- Phylum: Arthropoda
- Clade: Pancrustacea
- Class: Insecta
- Order: Lepidoptera
- Family: Crambidae
- Genus: Catoptria
- Species: C. bolivari

Binomial name
- Catoptria bolivari (Agenjo, 1947)

Synonyms
- Crambus bolivari Agenjo, 1947; Catoptria radiella mouterdella Marion, 1962; Crambus bolivari f. uniformis Agenjo, 1947

Species of moth

Catoptria bolivari is a species of moth in the family Crambidae described by Ramón Agenjo Cecilia in 1947. It is found in the Pyrenees of France and Spain.
