= Catoptria hannemanni =

Scientific classification
- Kingdom: Animalia
- Phylum: Arthropoda
- Clade: Pancrustacea
- Class: Insecta
- Order: Lepidoptera
- Family: Crambidae
- Genus: Catoptria
- Species: C. hannemanni

Binomial name
- Catoptria hannemanni Alberti, 1967

Species of moth

Catoptria hannemanni is a species of moth in the family Crambidae. It is found in Russia.
