= Catoptria kasyi =

Scientific classification
- Kingdom: Animalia
- Phylum: Arthropoda
- Clade: Pancrustacea
- Class: Insecta
- Order: Lepidoptera
- Family: Crambidae
- Genus: Catoptria
- Species: C. kasyi

Binomial name
- Catoptria kasyi Bleszynski, 1960

Species of moth

Catoptria kasyi is a species of moth in the family Crambidae. It is found in North Macedonia and Albania.
