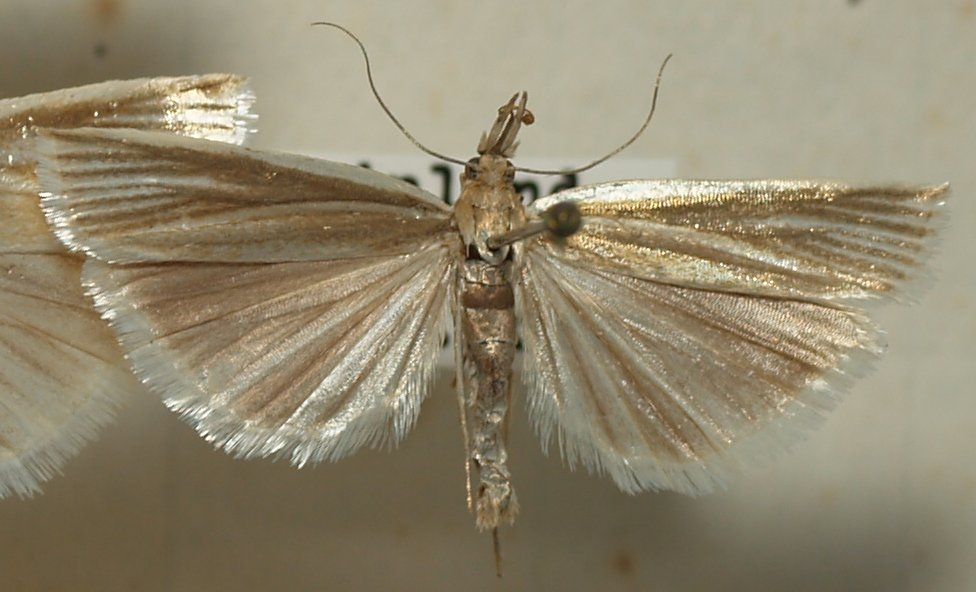

Scientific classification
- Kingdom: Animalia
- Phylum: Arthropoda
- Clade: Pancrustacea
- Class: Insecta
- Order: Lepidoptera
- Family: Crambidae
- Genus: Catoptria
- Species: C. lythargyrella

Binomial name
- Catoptria lythargyrella (Hübner, 1796)

Synonyms
- Tinea lythargyrella Hübner, 1796; Tinea lithargyrella Hübner, 1796; Crambus lythargyrellus ab. aequalellus Schawerda, 1913; Selagia lythargyralis Hübner, 1825

= Catoptria lythargyrella =

Species of moth

Catoptria lythargyrella is a species of moth of the family Crambidae. It is found in Europe.

The wingspan is 24–34 millimetres (0.94–1.34 in). The moth flies from July to September depending on the location.

The larvae feed on various mosses, but also on Ryegrass and Poa species.
