= Catoptria profluxella =

Scientific classification
- Kingdom: Animalia
- Phylum: Arthropoda
- Clade: Pancrustacea
- Class: Insecta
- Order: Lepidoptera
- Family: Crambidae
- Genus: Catoptria
- Species: C. profluxella

Binomial name
- Catoptria profluxella (Christoph in Romanoff, 1887)

Synonyms
- Crambus profluxella Christoph in Romanoff, 1887; Catoptria pseudociliciella Bleszynski, 1957

Species of moth

Catoptria profluxella is a moth in the family Crambidae. It was described by Hugo Theodor Christoph in 1887. It is found in Transcaucasia and the northern Caucasus.
