= Catoptria incertellus =

Scientific classification
- Kingdom: Animalia
- Phylum: Arthropoda
- Clade: Pancrustacea
- Class: Insecta
- Order: Lepidoptera
- Family: Crambidae
- Genus: Catoptria
- Species: C. incertellus

Binomial name
- Catoptria incertellus (Herrich-Schaffer, 1852)

Synonyms
- Crambus incertellus Herrich-Schaffer, 1852; Catoptria incertella

Species of moth

Catoptria incertellus is a moth species in the family Crambidae. It is found in Russia, southern Armenia, northwestern Iran, and northeastern Turkey.

The wingspan is {15.5-19.5 mm for females and 16-20.5 mm for males. Adults are on wing from the end of May to the end of September, with one generation per year. There might be a partial second generation.
