= Catoptria orobiella =

Scientific classification
- Kingdom: Animalia
- Phylum: Arthropoda
- Clade: Pancrustacea
- Class: Insecta
- Order: Lepidoptera
- Family: Crambidae
- Genus: Catoptria
- Species: C. orobiella

Binomial name
- Catoptria orobiella Huemer & Tarmann, 1994

Species of moth

Catoptria orobiella is a species of moth in the family Crambidae. It is found in Italy.
