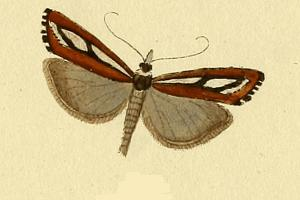

Scientific classification
- Kingdom: Animalia
- Phylum: Arthropoda
- Clade: Pancrustacea
- Class: Insecta
- Order: Lepidoptera
- Family: Crambidae
- Genus: Catoptria
- Species: C. speculalis

Binomial name
- Catoptria speculalis Hubner, 1825

Synonyms
- Crambus catoptrellus Zeller, 1863; Crambus speculellus Guenée, 1845

= Catoptria speculalis =

Species of moth

Catoptria speculalis is a species of moth in the family Crambidae. It is found in France, Germany, Austria, Switzerland, Italy and Bosnia and Herzegovina. It is extinct in Great Britain, where it was formerly known from the Scottish Highlands.

The wingspan is 22–29 mm.
