= Catoptria nana =

Scientific classification
- Kingdom: Animalia
- Phylum: Arthropoda
- Clade: Pancrustacea
- Class: Insecta
- Order: Lepidoptera
- Family: Crambidae
- Genus: Catoptria
- Species: C. nana

Binomial name
- Catoptria nana Okano, 1959

Synonyms
- Catoptria hokusaii Bleszynski, 1965

Species of moth

Catoptria nana is a moth in the family Crambidae. It was described by Okano in 1959. It is found in Japan (Honshu, Hokkaido).
