= Catoptria spodiellus =

Scientific classification
- Kingdom: Animalia
- Phylum: Arthropoda
- Clade: Pancrustacea
- Class: Insecta
- Order: Lepidoptera
- Family: Crambidae
- Genus: Catoptria
- Species: C. spodiellus

Binomial name
- Catoptria spodiellus (Rebel, 1916)

Synonyms
- Crambus spodiellus Rebel, 1916; Crambus plumbellus Caradja, 1933

Species of moth

Catoptria spodiellus is a moth in the family Crambidae. It was described by Hans Rebel in 1916. It is found in Russia (Tuva, Transbaikalia).
