= Catoptria latiradiellus =

Scientific classification
- Kingdom: Animalia
- Phylum: Arthropoda
- Clade: Pancrustacea
- Class: Insecta
- Order: Lepidoptera
- Family: Crambidae
- Genus: Catoptria
- Species: C. latiradiellus

Binomial name
- Catoptria latiradiellus (Walker, 1863)

Synonyms
- Crambus latiradiellus Walker, 1863; Crambus interruptus Grote, 1877

Species of moth

Catoptria latiradiellus, the three-spotted crambus moth or two-banded catoptria, is a moth in the family Crambidae. It was described by Francis Walker in 1863. It is found in North America, where it has been recorded from Yukon and British Columbia to Newfoundland, south to Pennsylvania, Michigan and Colorado.

Adults are on wing from July to August.

The larvae probably feed on mosses.
