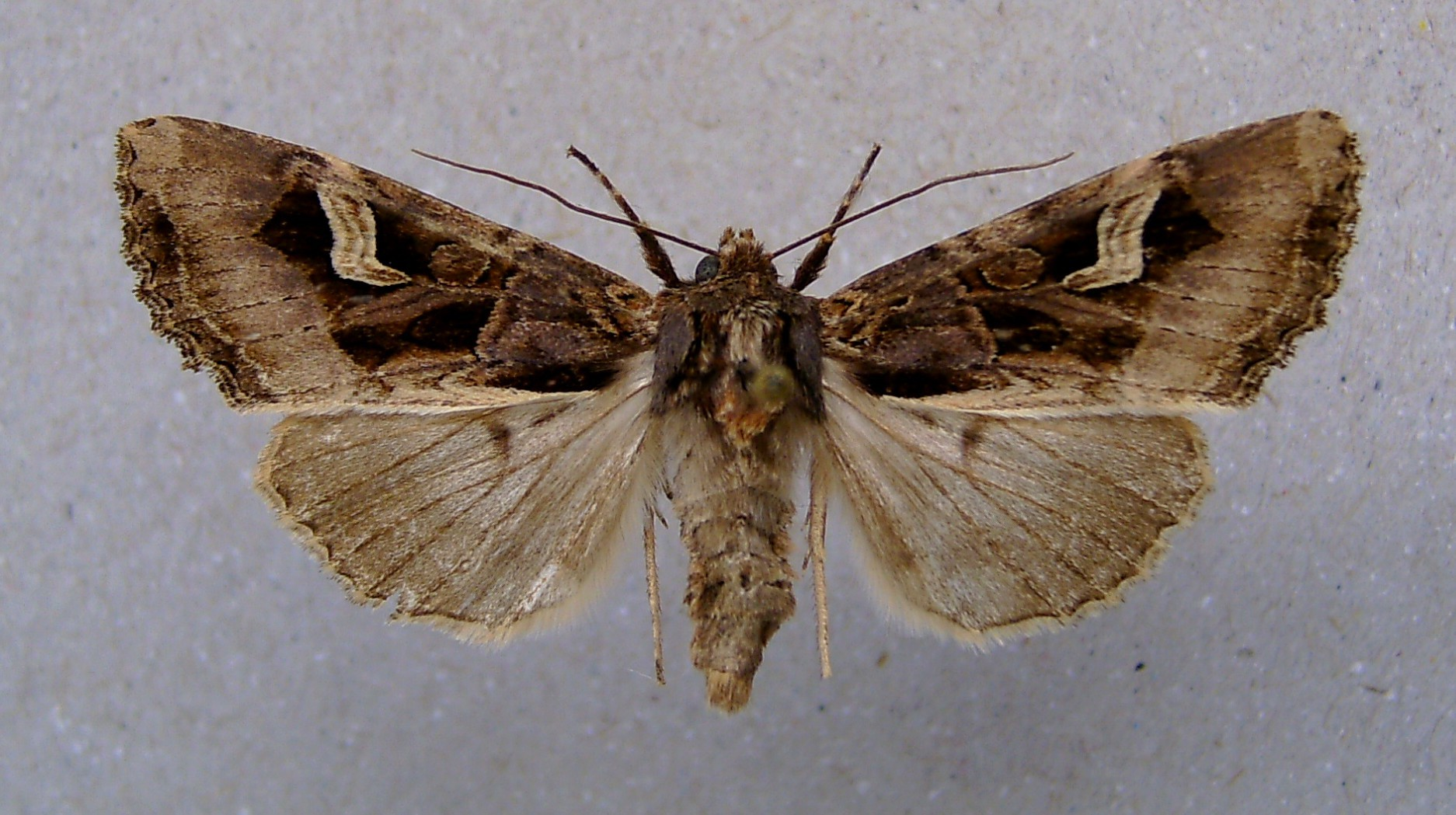
- Trigonophora flammea

Scientific classification
- Kingdom: Animalia
- Phylum: Arthropoda
- Clade: Pancrustacea
- Class: Insecta
- Order: Lepidoptera
- Superfamily: Noctuoidea
- Family: Noctuidae
- Subfamily: Cuculliinae
- Genus: Trigonophora; Hübner, 1821

= Trigonophora =

Genus of moths

Trigonophora is a genus of moths of the family Noctuidae.

== Species ==
- Trigonophora clava Wileman, 1912
- Trigonophora crassicornis (Oberthür, 1918)
- Trigonophora flammea (Esper, 1785)
- Trigonophora haasi (Staudinger, 1891)
- Trigonophora jodea (Herrich-Schäffer, 1850)
