= Catoptria confusellus =

Scientific classification
- Kingdom: Animalia
- Phylum: Arthropoda
- Clade: Pancrustacea
- Class: Insecta
- Order: Lepidoptera
- Family: Crambidae
- Genus: Catoptria
- Species: C. confusellus

Binomial name
- Catoptria confusellus (Staudinger, 1882)

Synonyms
- Crambus confusellus Staudinger, 1881; Catoptria confusella

Species of moth

Catoptria confusellus is a species of moth in the family Crambidae described by Otto Staudinger in 1882. It is found in Austria, the Czech Republic, Slovakia, Hungary, Romania, Bulgaria, Serbia and Montenegro, Albania, the Republic of Macedonia, Greece, Asia Minor and Syria.
