= Catoptria cabardinica =

Scientific classification
- Kingdom: Animalia
- Phylum: Arthropoda
- Clade: Pancrustacea
- Class: Insecta
- Order: Lepidoptera
- Family: Crambidae
- Genus: Catoptria
- Species: C. cabardinica

Binomial name
- Catoptria cabardinica Bolov, 1999

Species of moth

Catoptria cabardinica is a species of moth in the family Crambidae. It is found in Russia.
