= Catoptria pauperellus =

Scientific classification
- Kingdom: Animalia
- Phylum: Arthropoda
- Clade: Pancrustacea
- Class: Insecta
- Order: Lepidoptera
- Family: Crambidae
- Genus: Catoptria
- Species: C. pauperellus

Binomial name
- Catoptria pauperellus (Treitschke, 1832)

Synonyms
- Chilo pauperellus Treitschke, 1832; Catoptria pauperella

Species of moth

Catoptria pauperellus is a species of moth in the family Crambidae. It is found in Poland, Slovakia, Ukraine, Romania, Serbia and Montenegro, Bosnia and Herzegovina and Albania.
