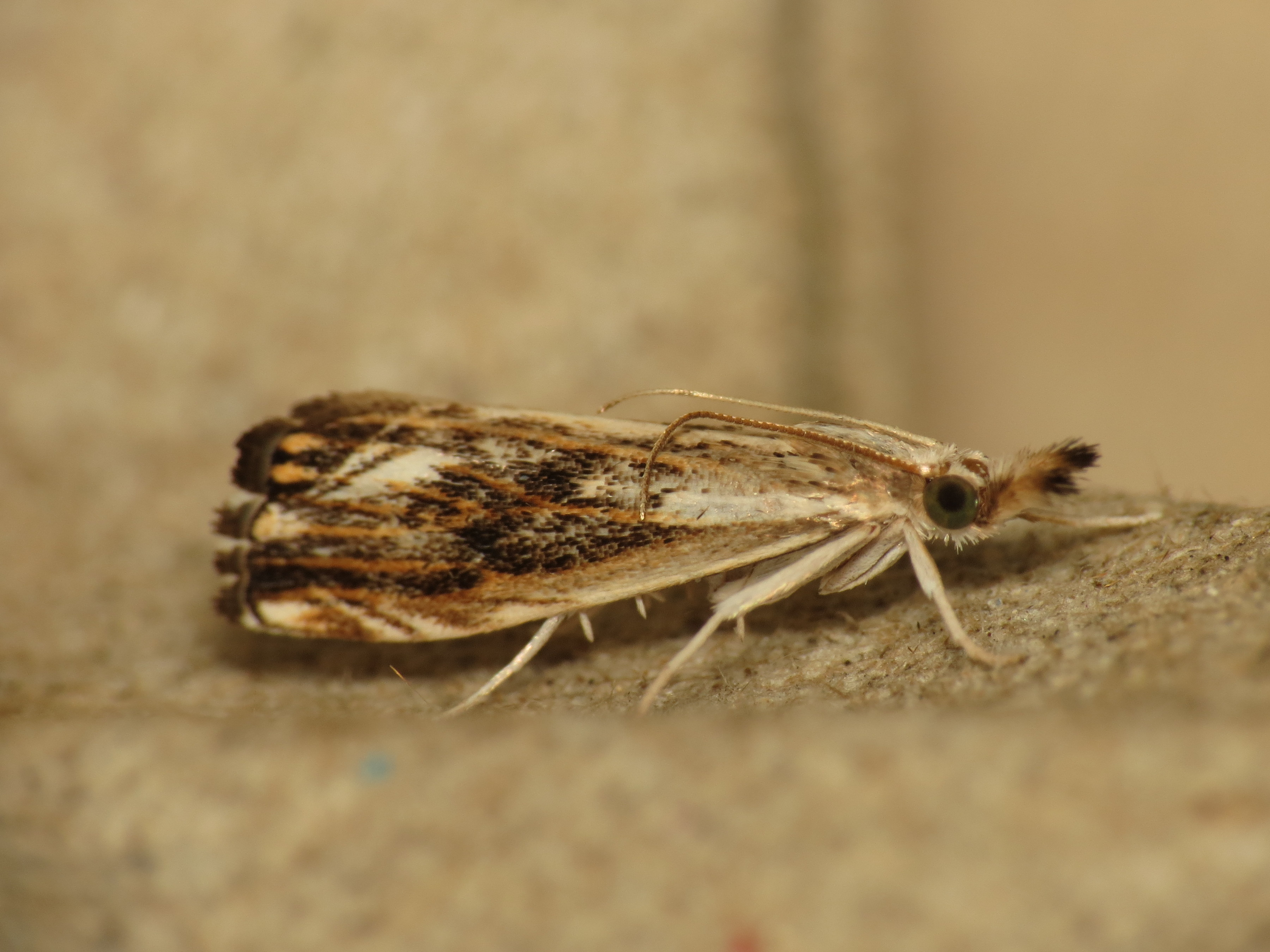
- Catoptria verellus Denmark

Scientific classification
- Kingdom: Animalia
- Phylum: Arthropoda
- Clade: Pancrustacea
- Class: Insecta
- Order: Lepidoptera
- Family: Crambidae
- Genus: Catoptria
- Species: C. verellus

Binomial name
- Catoptria verellus (Zincken, 1817)

Synonyms
- Chilo verellus Zincken, 1817; Teras radiolana Eversmann, 1844

= Catoptria verellus =

Species of moth

Catoptria verellus is a species of moth of the family Crambidae. It is found in Europe.

The wingspan is 17–18 mm. The forewings are brown, suffusedly mixed with blackish except on veins and towards costa; anterior half of costa white; an undefined white median streak from base, becoming soon obsolete; second line white, strongly curved and interrupted above middle, indented near dorsum, indentation preceded by an oblique white wedge; cilia rather metallic grey, with three or four slender white bars. Hindwings are light grey.

The moth flies from July to August depending on the location.

The larvae feed on mosses on old apple (Malus), plum (Prunus) and poplar (Populus) trees.
