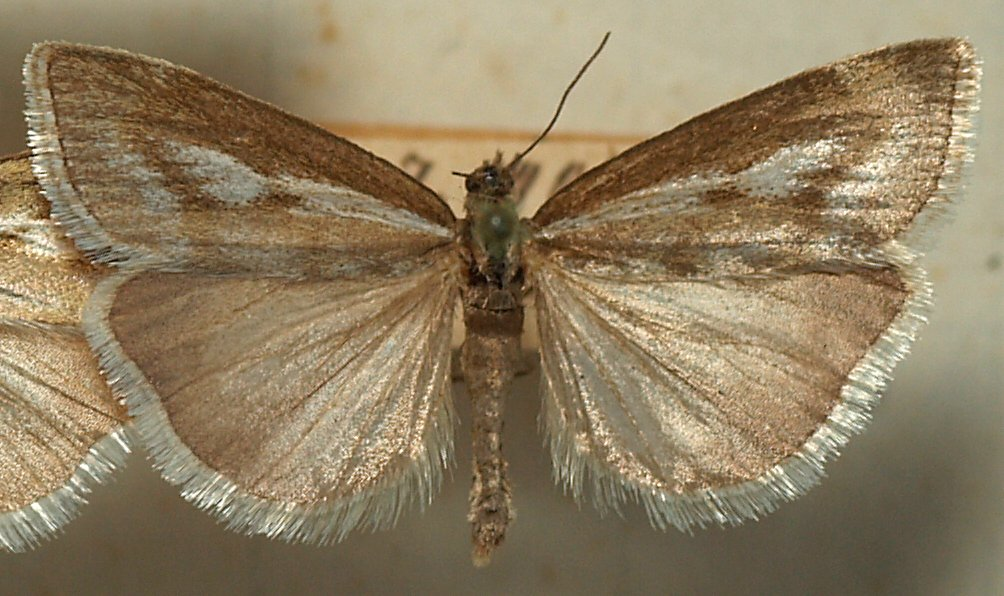

Scientific classification
- Kingdom: Animalia
- Phylum: Arthropoda
- Clade: Pancrustacea
- Class: Insecta
- Order: Lepidoptera
- Family: Crambidae
- Genus: Catoptria
- Species: C. combinella

Binomial name
- Catoptria combinella (Denis & Schiffermüller, 1775)

Synonyms
- Tinea combinella Denis & Schiffermüller, 1775; Crambus simplonellus Duponchel, [1837]; Crambus combinellus f. atrox Galvagni, 1920; Crambus novellus Guenée, 1845; Exoria combinalis Hübner, 1825

= Catoptria combinella =

Species of moth

Catoptria combinella is a species of moth of the family Crambidae. It is found in Europe.
