= Catoptria colchicellus =

Scientific classification
- Kingdom: Animalia
- Phylum: Arthropoda
- Clade: Pancrustacea
- Class: Insecta
- Order: Lepidoptera
- Family: Crambidae
- Genus: Catoptria
- Species: C. colchicellus

Binomial name
- Catoptria colchicellus (Lederer, 1870)

Synonyms
- Crambus colchicellus Lederer, 1870

Species of moth

Catoptria colchicellus is a moth in the family Crambidae. It was described by Julius Lederer in 1870, as Crambus colchicellus. It is found in Transcaucasia, Turkey, and Iran.
