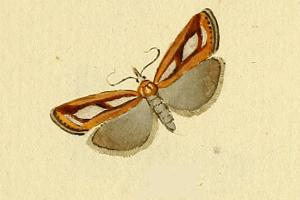

Scientific classification
- Kingdom: Animalia
- Phylum: Arthropoda
- Clade: Pancrustacea
- Class: Insecta
- Order: Lepidoptera
- Family: Crambidae
- Genus: Catoptria
- Species: C. myella

Binomial name
- Catoptria myella (Hubner, 1796)

Synonyms
- Tinea myella Hubner, 1796; Crambus hercyniae var. epimyellus de Joannis in Lhomme, 1935; Crambus myellus mellinellus Lattin, 1951

= Catoptria myella =

Species of moth

Catoptria myella is a species of moth in the family Crambidae. It is found in large parts of Europe, except Ireland, Great Britain, the Benelux, Fennoscandia, Denmark, the Baltic region, the Czech Republic, Slovakia and the Iberian Peninsula.

The wingspan is 21–28 mm. Adults have been recorded from May to September.

== Subspecies ==
- Catoptria myella myella (Alps, Karpathians)
- Catoptria myella mellinella (de Lattin, 1951) (southern Alps)
