= Catoptria acutangulellus =

Scientific classification
- Kingdom: Animalia
- Phylum: Arthropoda
- Clade: Pancrustacea
- Class: Insecta
- Order: Lepidoptera
- Family: Crambidae
- Genus: Catoptria
- Species: C. acutangulellus

Binomial name
- Catoptria acutangulellus (Herrich-Schaffer, 1847)

Synonyms
- Crambus acutangulellus Herrich-Schaffer, 1847; Catoptria acutangulella; Crambus acutangulus Hampson, 1896; Crambus acutangulellus ab. inangulellus Schawerda, 1908; Crambus luctiferellus var. albidellus Krone, 1911; Crambus actuangulellus macedonica Osthelder, 1951

Species of moth

Catoptria acutangulellus is a species of moth in the family Crambidae. It is found in France, Italy and on the Balkan Peninsula.

== Subspecies ==
- Catoptria acutangulellus acutangulella
- Catoptria acutangulellus macedonica (Osthelder, 1951) (Macedonia)
