= Catoptria digitellus =

Scientific classification
- Kingdom: Animalia
- Phylum: Arthropoda
- Clade: Pancrustacea
- Class: Insecta
- Order: Lepidoptera
- Family: Crambidae
- Genus: Catoptria
- Species: C. digitellus

Binomial name
- Catoptria digitellus (Herrich-Schaffer, 1849)

Synonyms
- Crambus digitellus Herrich-Schaffer, 1849; Catoptria digitella; Crambus hospitali Agenjo, 1952; Crambus marteni Hartig, 1953; Crambus petrosellus de Joannis, 1915; Crambus petrificellus Duponchel, 1836 (preocc.)

Species of moth

Catoptria digitellus is a species of moth in the family Crambidae described by Gottlieb August Wilhelm Herrich-Schäffer in 1849. It is found in France and Spain.
