= Catoptria emiliae =

Scientific classification
- Kingdom: Animalia
- Phylum: Arthropoda
- Clade: Pancrustacea
- Class: Insecta
- Order: Lepidoptera
- Family: Crambidae
- Genus: Catoptria
- Species: C. emiliae

Binomial name
- Catoptria emiliae Savenkov, 1984

Species of moth

Catoptria emiliae is a moth in the family Crambidae. It was described by Nikolaj Savenkov in 1984. It is found in Russia.
