= Catoptria satakei =

Scientific classification
- Kingdom: Animalia
- Phylum: Arthropoda
- Clade: Pancrustacea
- Class: Insecta
- Order: Lepidoptera
- Family: Crambidae
- Genus: Catoptria
- Species: C. satakei

Binomial name
- Catoptria satakei (Okano, 1962)

Synonyms
- Agriphila satakei Okano, 1962

Species of moth

Catoptria satakei is a moth in the family Crambidae. It was described by Okano in 1962. It is found in Japan (Hokkaido).
