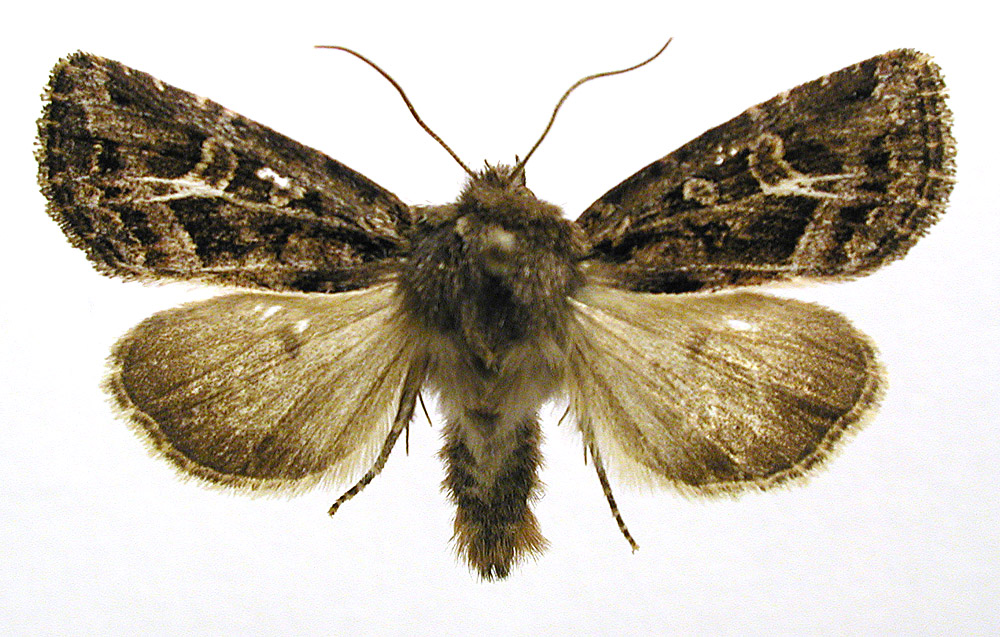
- Celaena haworthii

Scientific classification
- Domain: Eukaryota
- Kingdom: Animalia
- Phylum: Arthropoda
- Class: Insecta
- Order: Lepidoptera
- Superfamily: Noctuoidea
- Family: Noctuidae
- Genus: Celaena; Stephens, 1829

= Celaena =

Genus of moths

Celaena is a genus of moths of the family Noctuidae.

== Species ==
- Celaena haworthii – Haworth's minor (Curtis, 1829)
