= Alexander Kirilow Drenowski =

Bulgarian entomologist

Alexander Kirilow Drenowski (22 July 1879, Ruse – 24 April 1967, Sofia) was a Bulgarian entomologist who specialised in Lepidoptera.

Between 1904 and 1953 Drenowski wrote 77 scientific papers on the butterflies of Bulgaria.His most significant work was on the butterflies of the Bulgarian high mountains Rila, Pirin, Rhodope and Stara Planina.
