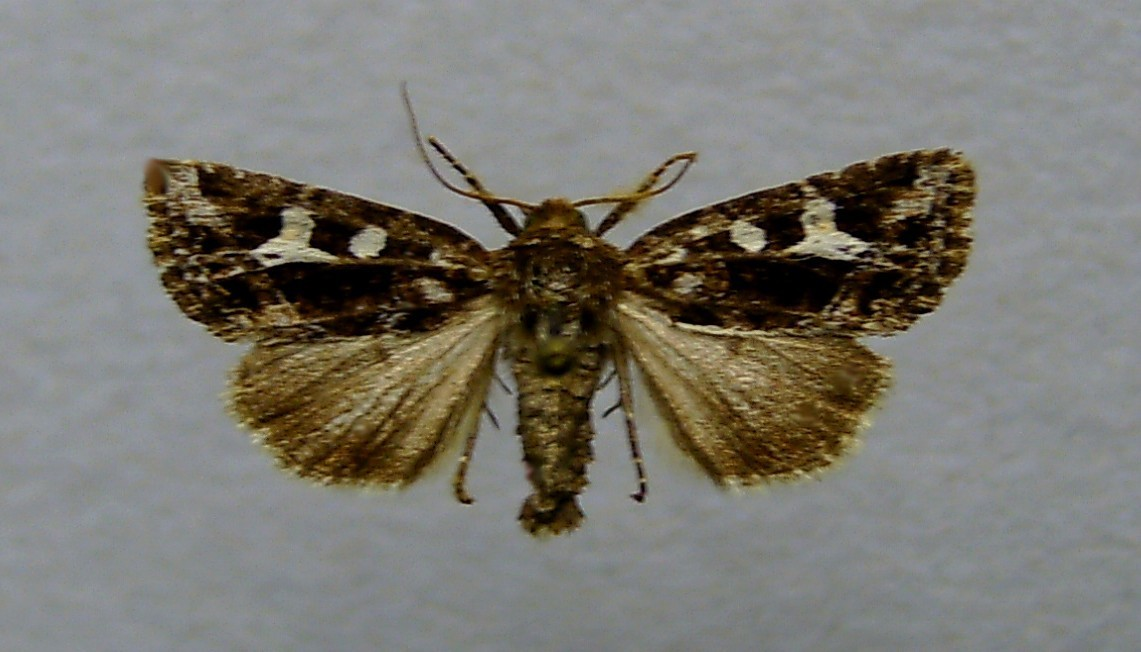

Scientific classification
- Domain: Eukaryota
- Kingdom: Animalia
- Phylum: Arthropoda
- Class: Insecta
- Order: Lepidoptera
- Superfamily: Noctuoidea
- Family: Noctuidae
- Genus: Celaena
- Species: C. haworthii

Binomial name
- Celaena haworthii (Curtis, 1829)

Synonyms
- Apamea haworthii Curtis, 1829; Celaena hibernica Stephens, 1829; Celaena lancea Stephens, 1829; Agrotis erupta Germar, [1842]; Gortyna morio Eversmann, 1843; Oligia havorthi Hampson, 1908; Oligia haworthii sachalinensis Matsumura, 1925; Celaena haworthi

= Celaena haworthii =

Haworth's minor

Species of moth

Celaena haworthii, or Haworth's minor, is a moth of the family Noctuidae. The species was first described by John Curtis in 1829. It is found from the British Isles and France through northern Europe including Scandinavia, east to the Urals and across the Palearctic to Siberia and up to the Pacific Ocean.

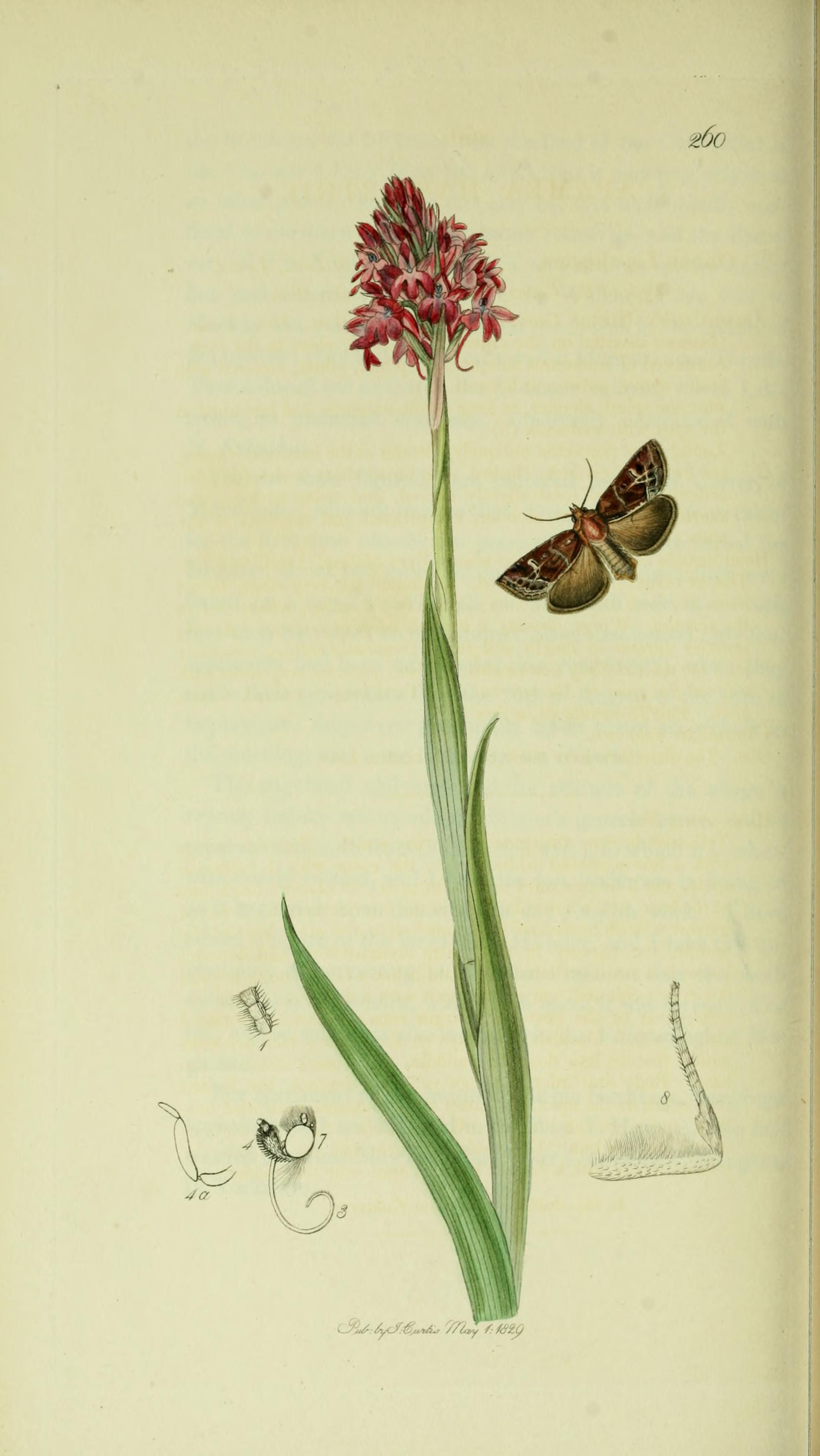
Illustration from John Curtis's British Entomology Volume 5

== Description ==
The wingspan is 25–30 mm. Forewing brown tinged with reddish; the lines dark, indistinct; the outer followed by a pale oblique band reaching vein 6; the submarginal line, close to margin, dentate, whitish, preceded by a dark shade containing three or four black wedge-shaped marks; orbicular small, annular, rufous, sometimes obsolete; reniform ochreous with rufous centre, in some cases all white; claviform short, black; median vein and bases of veins 3, 4, and generally vein 1 white or whitish; hindwing dull brownish, darker along the termen; cellspot and outer line dark; this British form is smaller and less brightly marked than the continental form, erupta Germ., which is velvety brown black, dusted in places with pale scales, and with all the pale markings stronger, especially the stigmata; without reddish tinge, or at least not prominently reddish; — the ab. hibernica Stph., from Ireland, is redder, with the pale markings less defined.

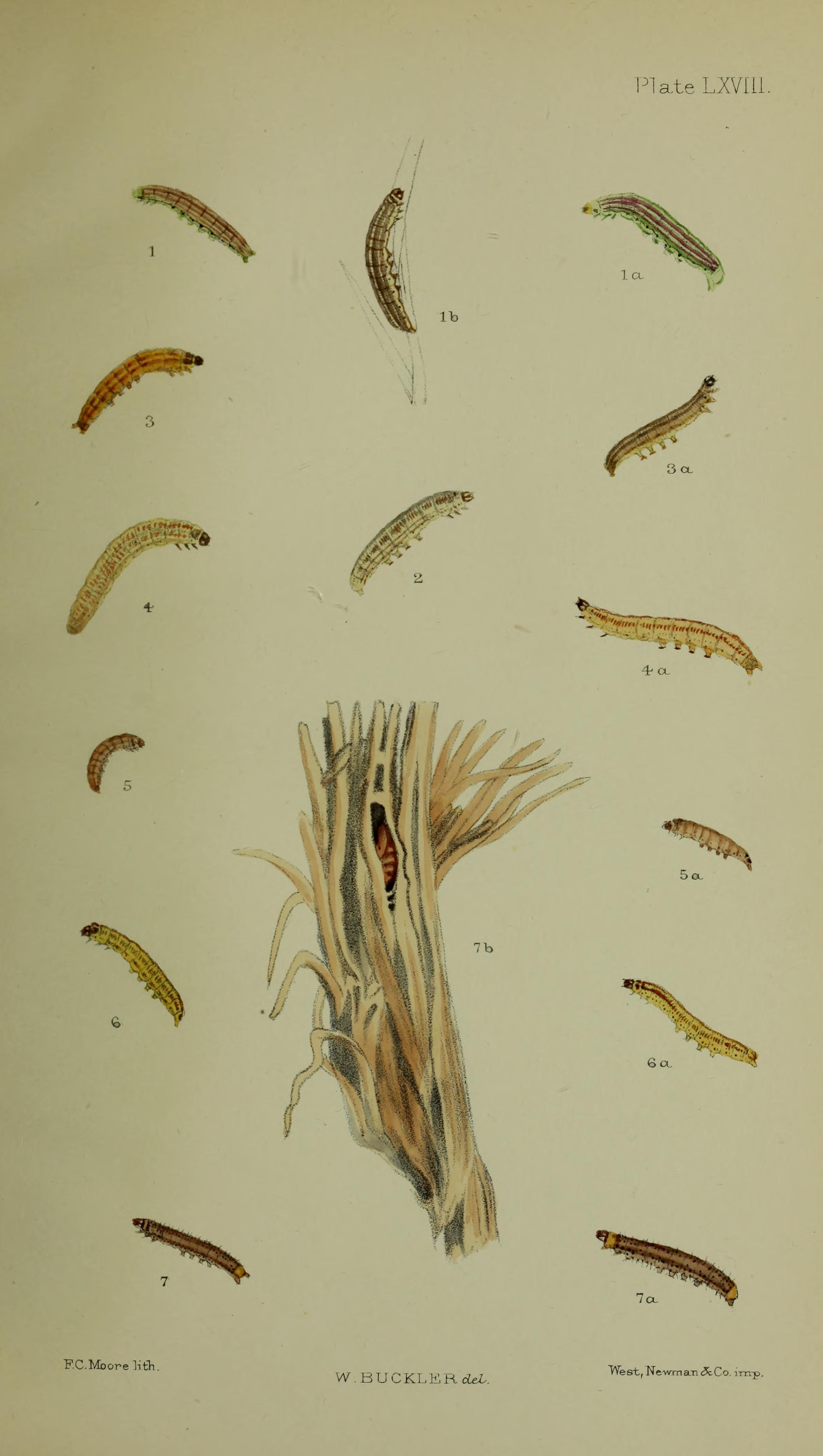
Fig.7, 7a larva after last moult 7b pupa in situ in cottongrass (Eriophorum)

== Biology ==
Adults are on wing from July to the beginning of October in one generation.

Larva pinkish ochreous to purplish brown; dorsal and subdorsal lines pale; the tubercles black; head, and thoracic plate pale reddish brown. The larvae feed on the root crowns and stems of various grasses, as well as Eriophorum and Juncus species. Adults are active during the night and day and feed on flower nectar of Calluna vulgaris, Origanum vulgare and Molinia species.
