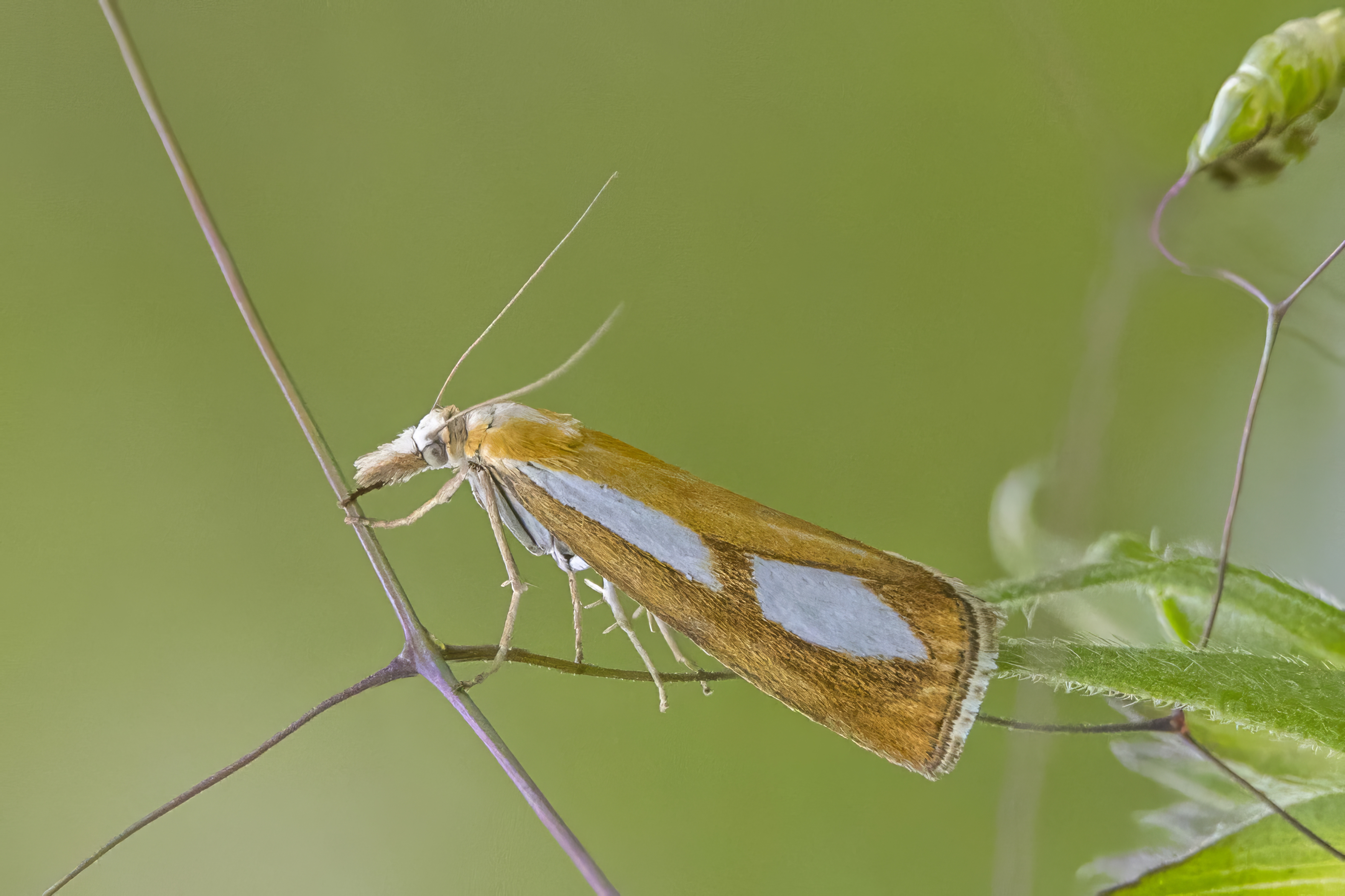
- Male, Switzerland

Scientific classification
- Kingdom: Animalia
- Phylum: Arthropoda
- Clade: Pancrustacea
- Class: Insecta
- Order: Lepidoptera
- Family: Crambidae
- Genus: Catoptria
- Species: C. pinella

Binomial name
- Catoptria pinella (Linnaeus, 1758)

Synonyms
- Phalaena (Tinea) pinella Linnaeus, 1758; Catoptria pinella albarracinella (Agenjo, 1954); Catoptria pinella algeriellus (D. Lucas, 1932); Phalaena virginella Scopoli, 1763; Phalaena pinetalis Hübner, 1825; Phalaena Tinea pinetella Linnaeus, 1761; Crambus pineti Fabricius, 1798; Crambus pinetorum Westwood, 1840; Catoptria pinella siciliella Bleszynski, 1965; Catoptria pinella telekiella (Schmidt, 1930)

= Catoptria pinella =

Species of moth

Catoptria pinella is a species of moth of the family Crambidae. It is found in Europe, North Africa and across the Palearctic.

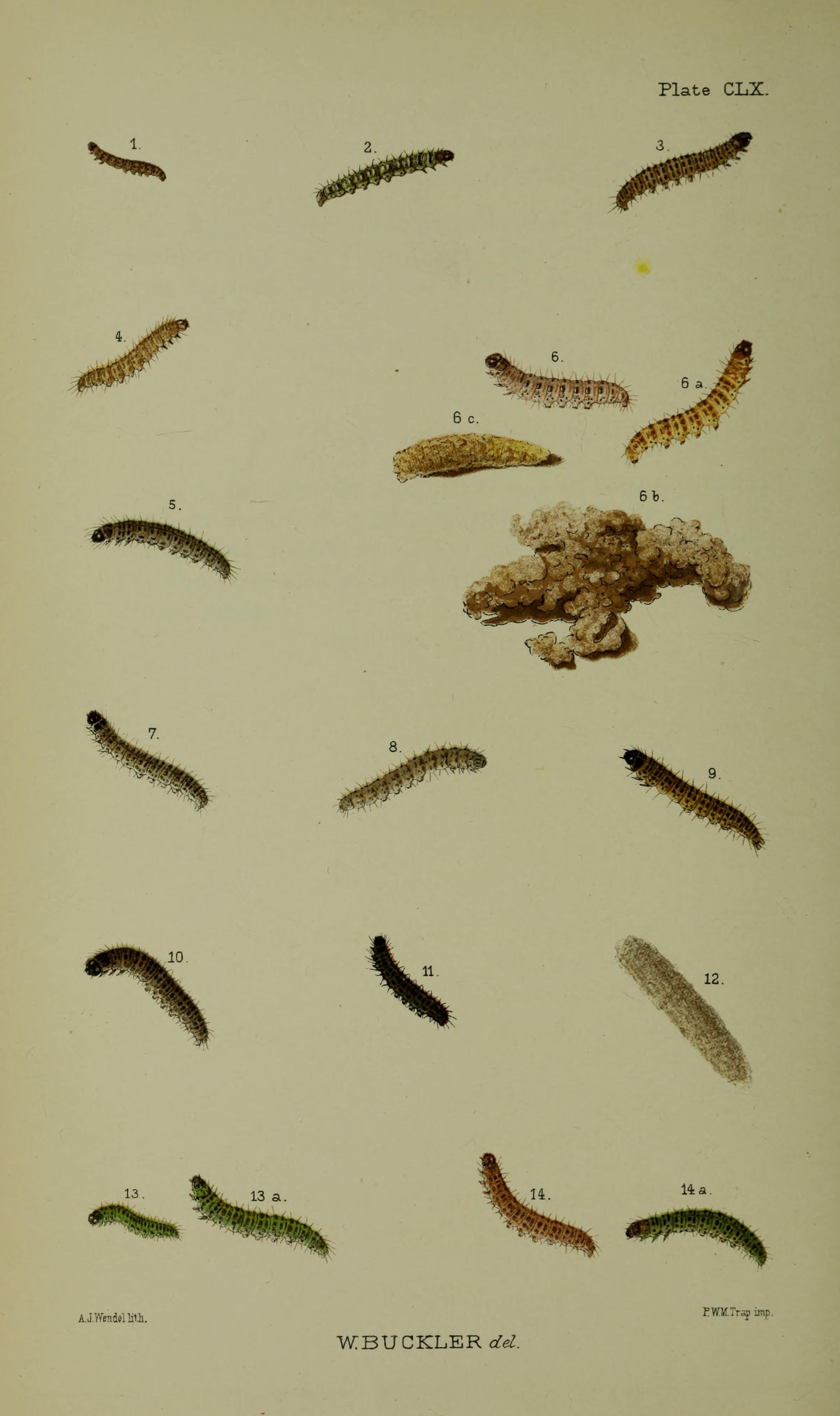
Fig. 11 larva after final moult

The wingspan is 18–24 mm. The face has a short cone. Forewings ferruginous-ochreous; a shining white broadly dilating median streak from base to 4, cut in middle by a dark brown oblique bar, posterior portion edged with dark brown; second line obscurely brown towards costa; cilia shining brownish. Hindwings are light grey. The larva is dull reddish-grey; spots black, head and plate of 2 black.

The moth flies from July to August depending on the location.

The larvae feed on various grasses.
