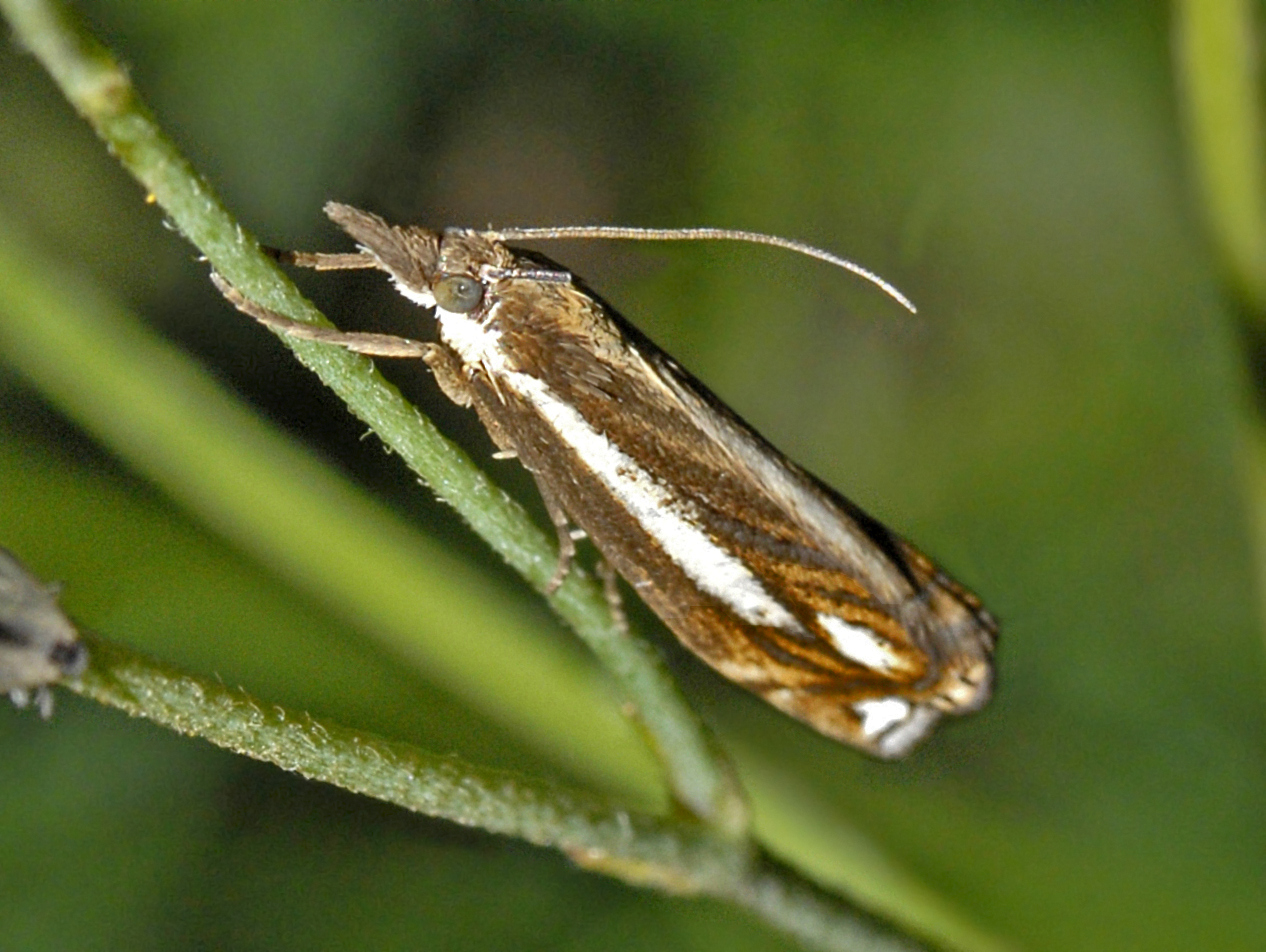

Scientific classification
- Kingdom: Animalia
- Phylum: Arthropoda
- Clade: Pancrustacea
- Class: Insecta
- Order: Lepidoptera
- Family: Crambidae
- Genus: Crambus
- Species: C. ericella

Binomial name
- Crambus ericella (Hübner, 1813)

Synonyms
- Tinea ericella Hübner, 1813; Argyroteuchia ericalis Hübner, 1816

= Crambus ericella =

Species of moth

Crambus ericella is a species of moth of the family Crambidae described by Jacob Hübner in 1813.

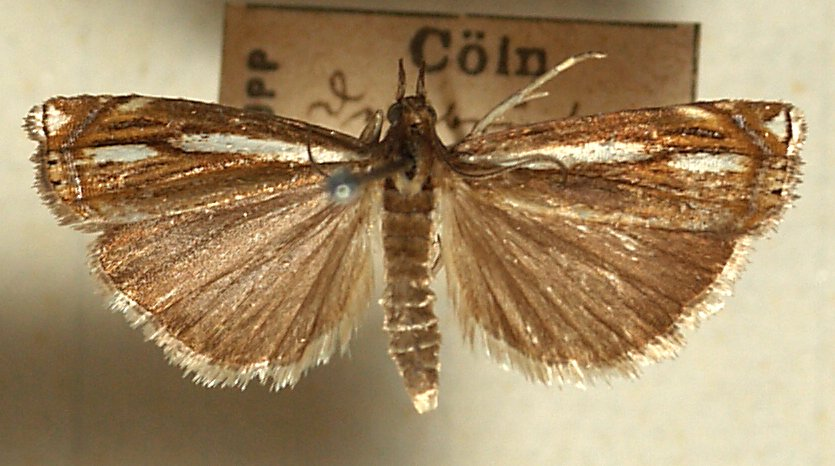
Mounted specimen

== Distribution ==
This species can be found in most of Europe.

== Description ==
The wingspan is 21–28 millimetres (0.83–1.10 in). Forewings are dark brown, with well defined white longitudinal streaks and a white apical triangle. Meyrick - Forewings with apex hardly produced; golden-ochreous; a narrow white dorsal streak; a rather narrow shining white median longitudinal streak from base to 7/8, obliquely cut at 3/4 of length, apex truncate; grey dark-edged interneural streaks in disc posteriorly; second line shining white, bent, preceded by a white oblique costal mark; a small white triangular subapical spot; five black dots on lower part of termen, sometimes surrounded by whitish suffusion; cilia metallic. Hindwings grey.

== Biology ==
These moths fly in a single generation from May to September depending on the location. The larvae feed on Corynephorus canescens, Festuca ovina, Sorbus and Deschampsia flexuosa.
