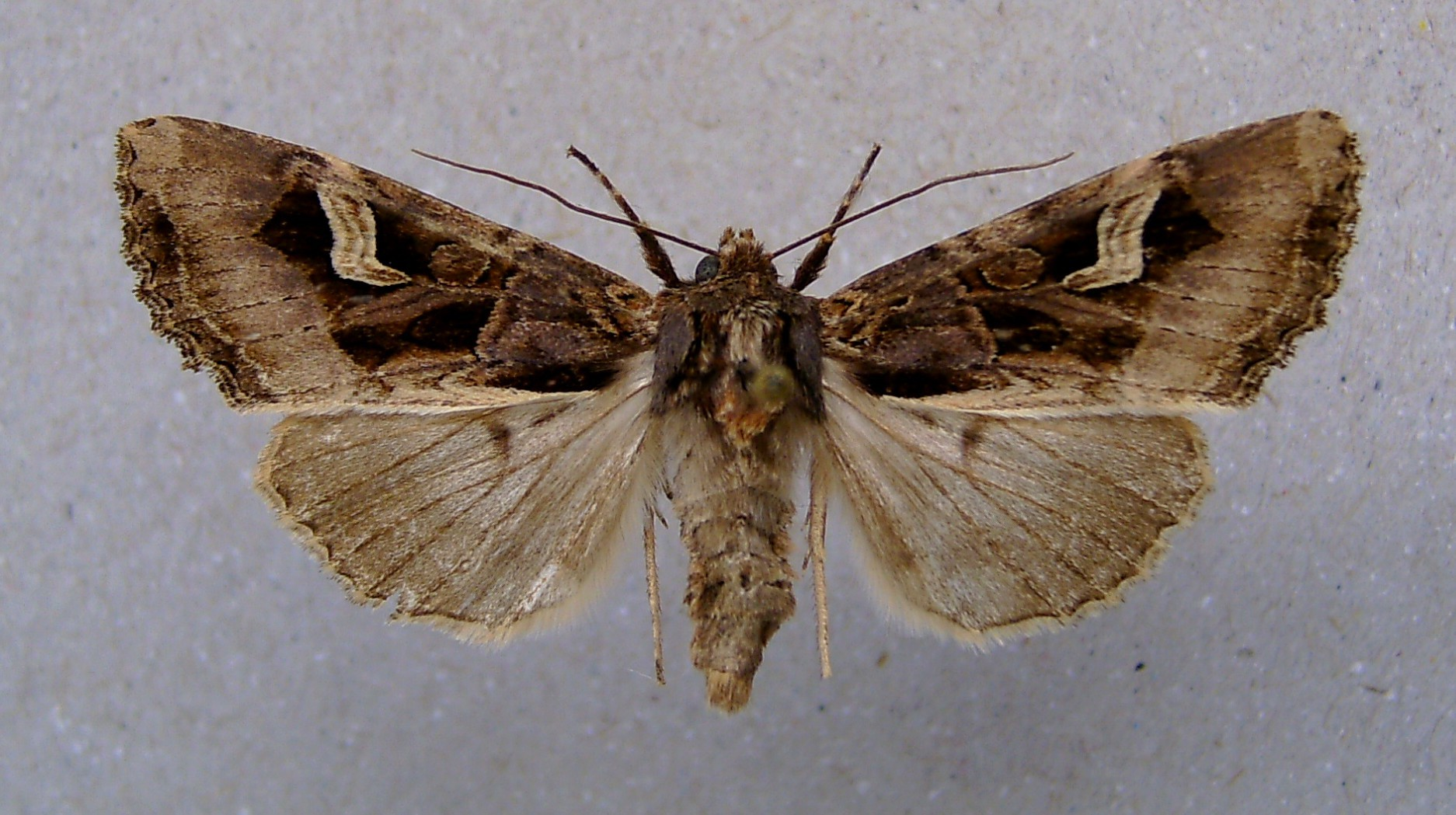

Scientific classification
- Kingdom: Animalia
- Phylum: Arthropoda
- Class: Insecta
- Order: Lepidoptera
- Superfamily: Noctuoidea
- Family: Noctuidae
- Genus: Trigonophora
- Species: T. flammea

Binomial name
- Trigonophora flammea (Esper, 1785)

= Flame brocade =

Trigonophora flammea

Species of moth

The flame brocade (Trigonophora flammea) is a moth of the family Noctuidae. The nominate subspecies T. f. flammea is found in Europe, mostly in the Mediterranean area up to Normandy. It is also found on the Channel Islands and it has spread to Southern England and Ireland. It is found in the Maghreb as the subspecies T. f. vividior. This also occurs in parts of Spain. The species lives primarily in dry areas, on warm slopes, grassy scrubland and in karstic oak.

== Technical description and variation ==
The wingspan is 44–52 mm. Forewing purplish grey brown, the grey predominating in basal area; median area velvety blackish between subcostal vein and vein 1; the claviform stigma velvety black, followed by an elongated patch of ground colour along vein 2 which is black; orbicular reddish grey, ovaland flattened, with pale annulus; reniforrn very large, creamwhite, containing two grey lines, angled acutely inwards along median vein; inner margin diffusely creamy white; a long black streak above it from near base; submarginal line paler than the ground colour, followed by a dark cloud; hindwing shining luteous brownish in outer half, with large dark cellspot and dark veins and outer line.

== Similar species ==
- Trigonophora crassicornis
- Trigonophora jode

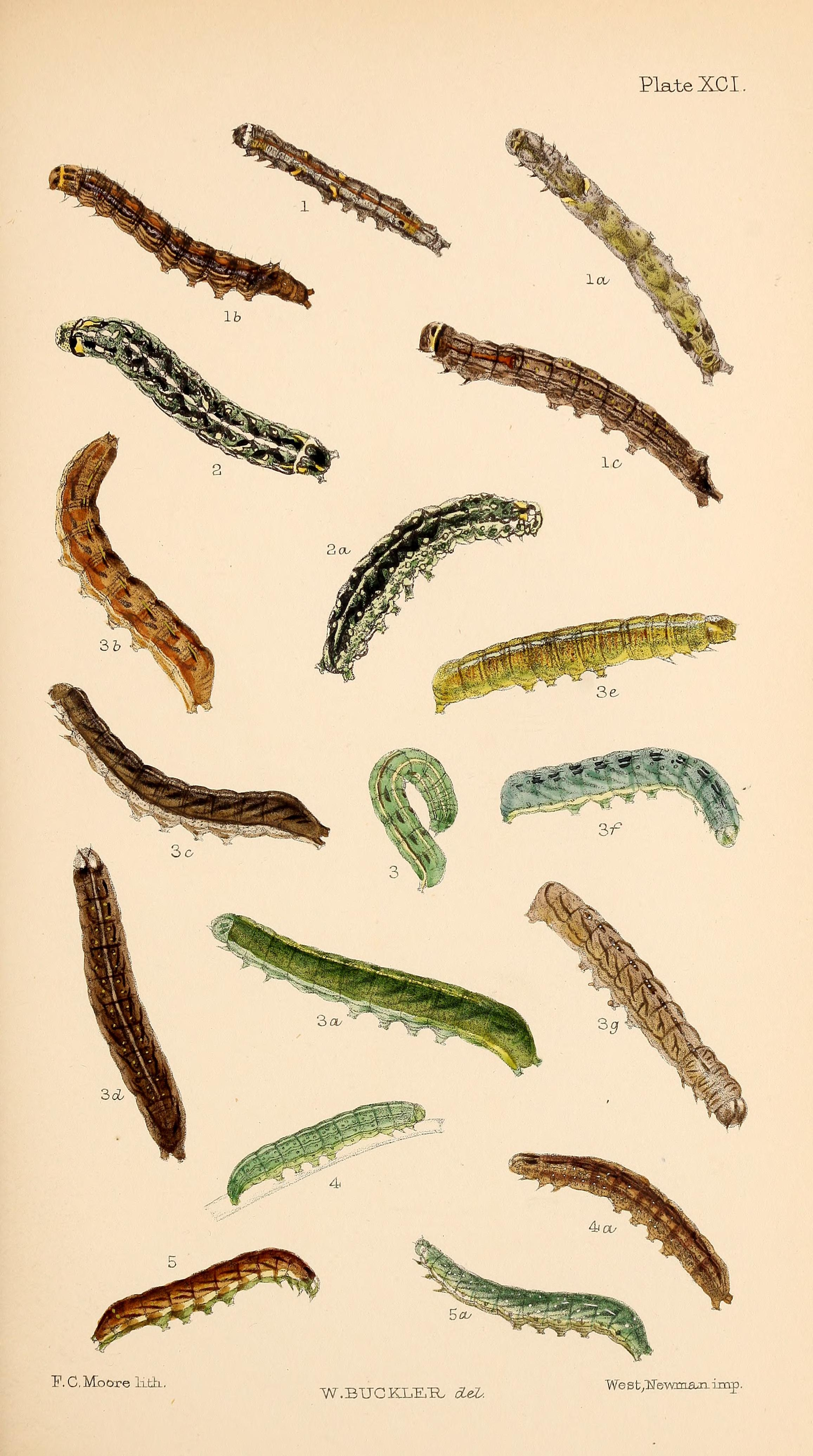
4, 4a, larva after last moult

== Biology ==
Adults are on wing from October to November.

Larvae are wood brown mottled with grey; a row of diamond-shaped reddish brown blotches traversed by the pale dorsal line; tubercles black, with white centres; subdorsal lines pale, with fine dark edges; spiracles yellowish white.

The larvae feed on low plants such as Ranunculus in the early stages, later preferring such species as Fraxinus and Ligustrum.

== British Isles ==
Formerly, it was a resident in Sussex until becoming extinct there in the late 19th century. In October 2011 however, The charity Butterfly Conservation reported that the moth has apparently become established in the south coast of England.
