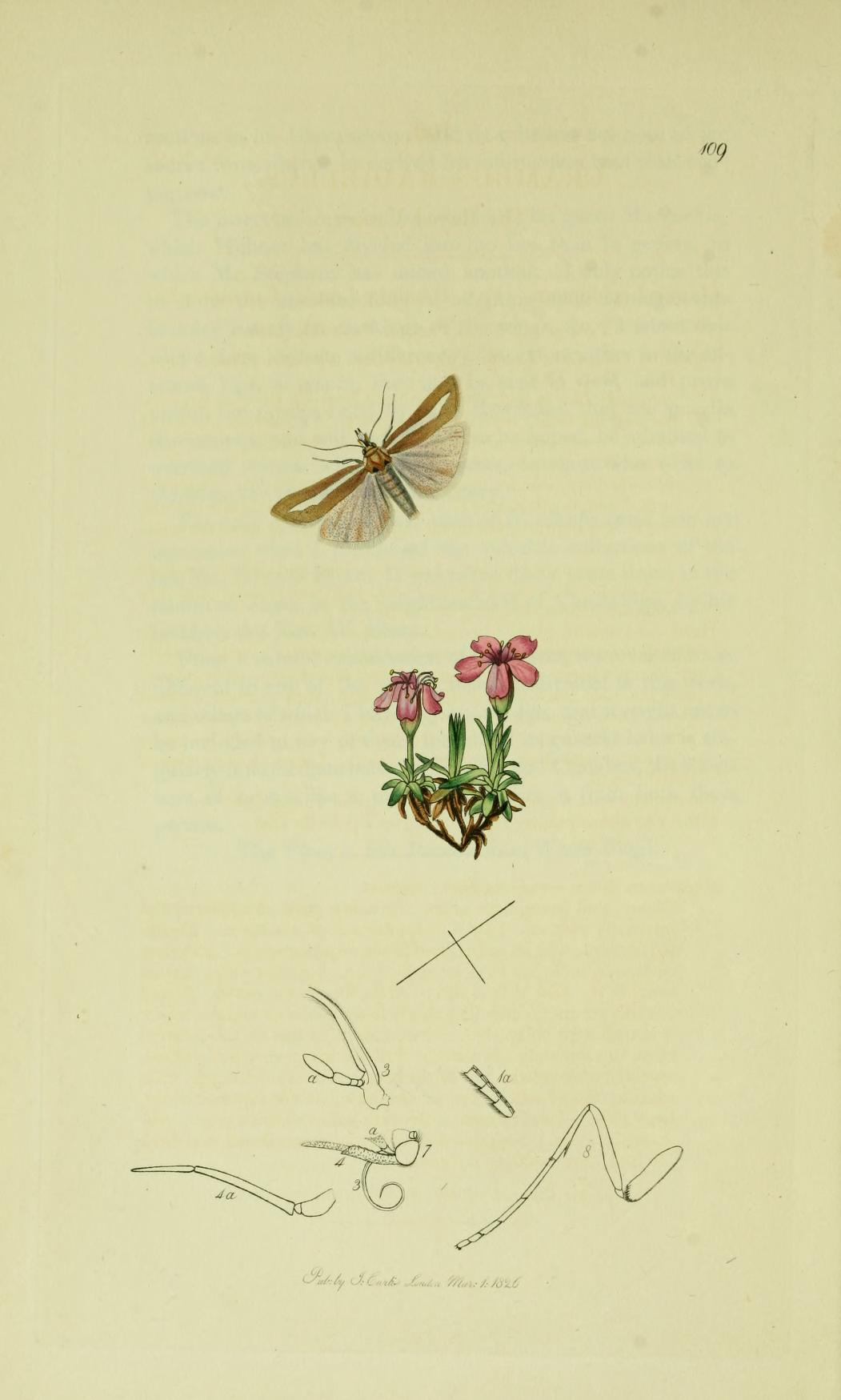
- Illustration from John Curtis's British Entomology Volume 6

Scientific classification
- Kingdom: Animalia
- Phylum: Arthropoda
- Clade: Pancrustacea
- Class: Insecta
- Order: Lepidoptera
- Family: Crambidae
- Genus: Catoptria
- Species: C. furcatellus

Binomial name
- Catoptria furcatellus (Zetterstedt, 1839)

Synonyms
- Chilo furcatella Zetterstedt, 1839; Catoptria furcatella; Crambus radiolellus Herrich-Schäffer, [1848]; Crambus lapponicellus Duponchel, 1844

= Catoptria furcatellus =

Species of moth

Catoptria furcatellus, the northern grass-veneer, is a moth of the family Crambidae described by Johan Wilhelm Zetterstedt in 1839. It is found in mountainous areas of Europe, including Fennoscandia, Wales, northern England, Scotland, the Alps and the Tatra Mountains.

The wingspan is 21–24 mm. Adults are on wing from June to August.

The larvae probably feed on Lycopodium and Festuca ovina.
