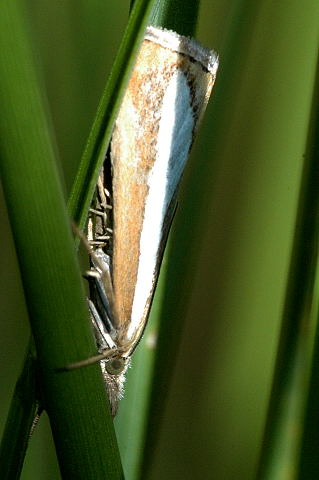

Scientific classification
- Kingdom: Animalia
- Phylum: Arthropoda
- Clade: Pancrustacea
- Class: Insecta
- Order: Lepidoptera
- Family: Crambidae
- Genus: Catoptria
- Species: C. margaritella

Binomial name
- Catoptria margaritella (Denis & Schiffermüller, 1775)

Synonyms
- Tinea margaritella Denis & Schiffermüller, 1775; Catoptria eumargaritalis Hübner, 1825; Crambus margaritellus var. montanicellus Bleszynski, 1948; Crambus magrimatellus Schmidt, 1909; Crambus margaritaceus Fabricius, 1798; Crambus margaritellus ab. flavescens Reutti, 1898; Crambus margaritellus f. dilucescens Osthelder, 1952; Crambus margaritellus f. gilveolellus Hauder, 1918; Crambus margaritellus f. rufellus Osthelder, 1952; Crambus margaritellus f. tenuivittellus Osthelder, 1952; Crambus margaritellus f. vulpinellus Osthelder, 1952; Crambus margaritellus mod. hoermammeri Osthelder, 1939

= Catoptria margaritella =

Pearl-band grass veneer

Species of moth

Catoptria margaritella, the pearl-band grass veneer, is a species of moth of the family Crambidae. It was described by Michael Denis and Ignaz Schiffermüller in 1775 and is found in Europe.

The wingspan is 20–24 mm. The forewings are ferruginous brown, becoming ferruginous-yellow dorsally; a shining white gradually dilating median streak from base to near termen, broadest at 4, thence pointed, upper edge straight; cilia shining pale fuscous. Hindwings are light grey.brown.

The moth flies from June to September depending on the location.

The larvae feed on various grasses and mosses.
