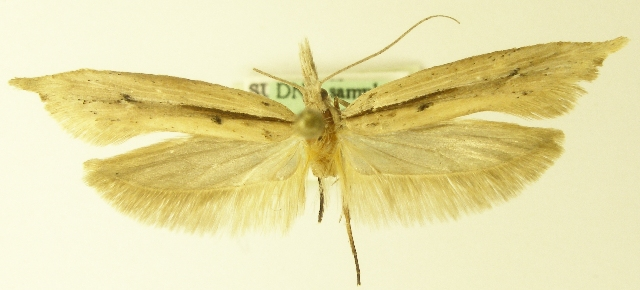

Scientific classification
- Domain: Eukaryota
- Kingdom: Animalia
- Phylum: Arthropoda
- Class: Insecta
- Order: Lepidoptera
- Family: Ypsolophidae
- Genus: Ypsolopha
- Species: Y. mucronella

Binomial name
- Ypsolopha mucronella (Scopoli, 1763)

Synonyms
- Phalaena mucronella Scopoli, 1763; Phalaena caudella Linnaeus, 1767; Tinea acinacidella Hübner, 1796

= Ypsolopha mucronella =

Species of moth

Ypsolopha mucronella is a moth of the family Ypsolophidae. It is found from Europe, through Siberia to Japan and in Asia Minor.

The wingspan is 26–33 mm. The forewings are narrow, apex very strongly and acutely produced; light brownish-ochreous, with scattered black scales, veins obscurely whitish; a dark fuscous streak along fold from base to beyond middle; sometimes other dark streaks between veins; a raised dark fuscous dot beneath fold before middle. Hindwings are pale whitish-fuscous. The larva is greenish-grey, marbled with rosy-ochreous; dorsal line whitish; 3 and 4 with pairs of black spots.

Adults are on wing from August to April.

The larvae feed on Euonymus species, including Euonymus europaeus.
