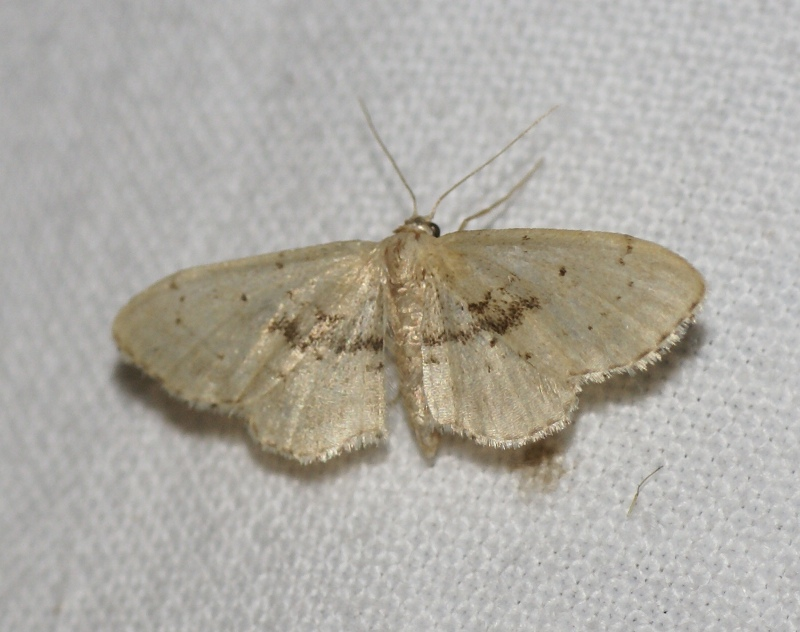

Scientific classification
- Kingdom: Animalia
- Phylum: Arthropoda
- Clade: Pancrustacea
- Class: Insecta
- Order: Lepidoptera
- Family: Geometridae
- Genus: Idaea
- Species: I. laevigata

Binomial name
- Idaea laevigata (Scopoli, 1763)

= Idaea laevigata =

Strange wave

Species of moth

Idaea laevigata, the strange wave, is a moth of the family Geometridae. It is found in Central Europe and Southern Europe. It occurs in Britain as an imported species.

The species has a wingspan c. 20 mm (0.79 in). The adults fly in two generations in June and July and again in September.

The larvae feed on dry plant material.
