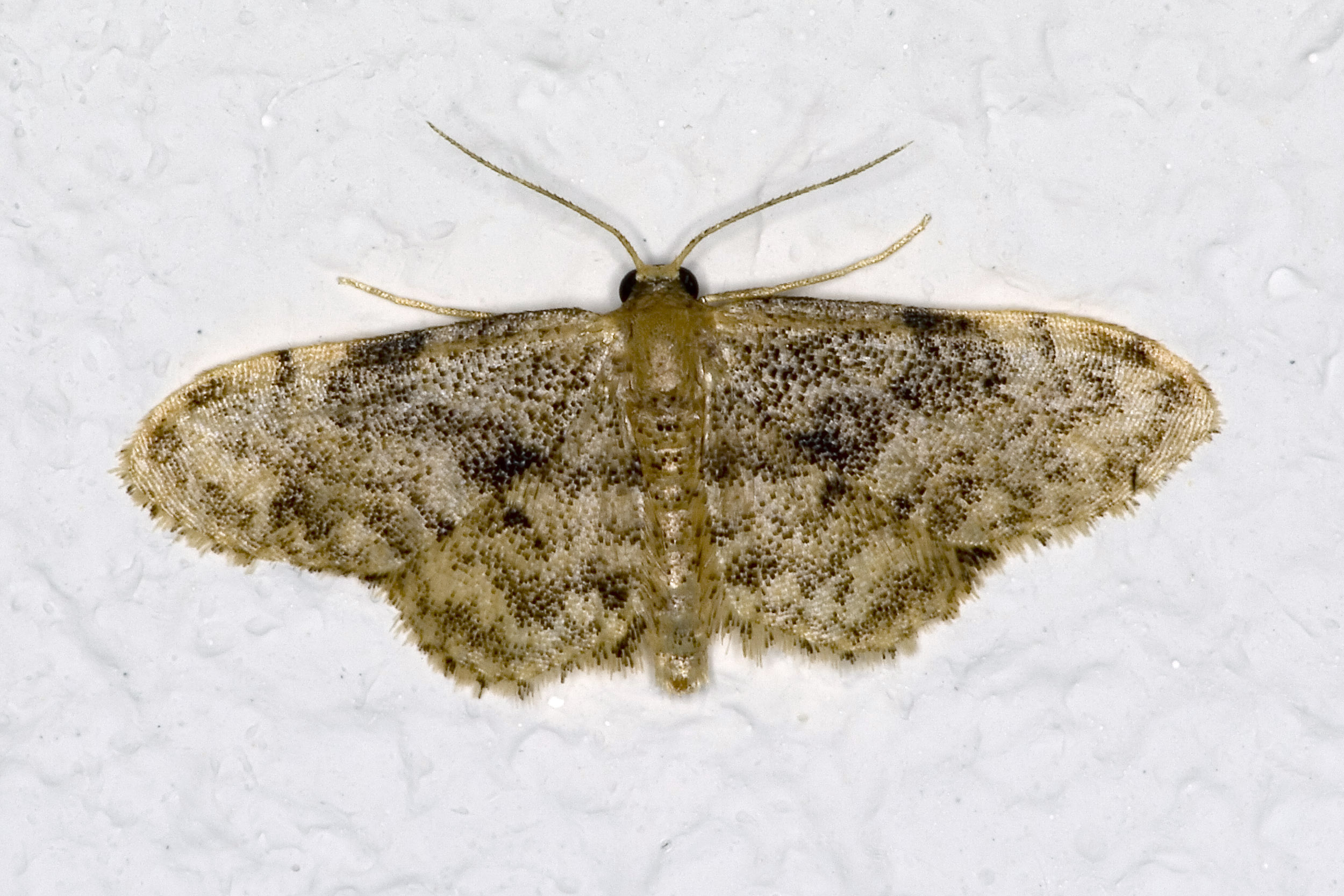

Scientific classification
- Kingdom: Animalia
- Phylum: Arthropoda
- Clade: Pancrustacea
- Class: Insecta
- Order: Lepidoptera
- Family: Geometridae
- Genus: Idaea
- Species: I. inquinata

Binomial name
- Idaea inquinata (Scopoli, 1763)

= Idaea inquinata =

Rusty wave

Species of moth

Idaea inquinata, the rusty wave, is a moth of the family Geometridae. It is found in Europe.

The species has a wingspan of 16–19 mm. The length of the forewings is 8–10 mm. The adults fly at night from June to July in Britain. The species is a rare and introduced species in England and is believed to have come to this country with imported dried flowers and herbs. The foodplant is believed to be dried or withered plants because of this.

1. The flight season refers to the British Isles. This may vary in other parts of the range.
