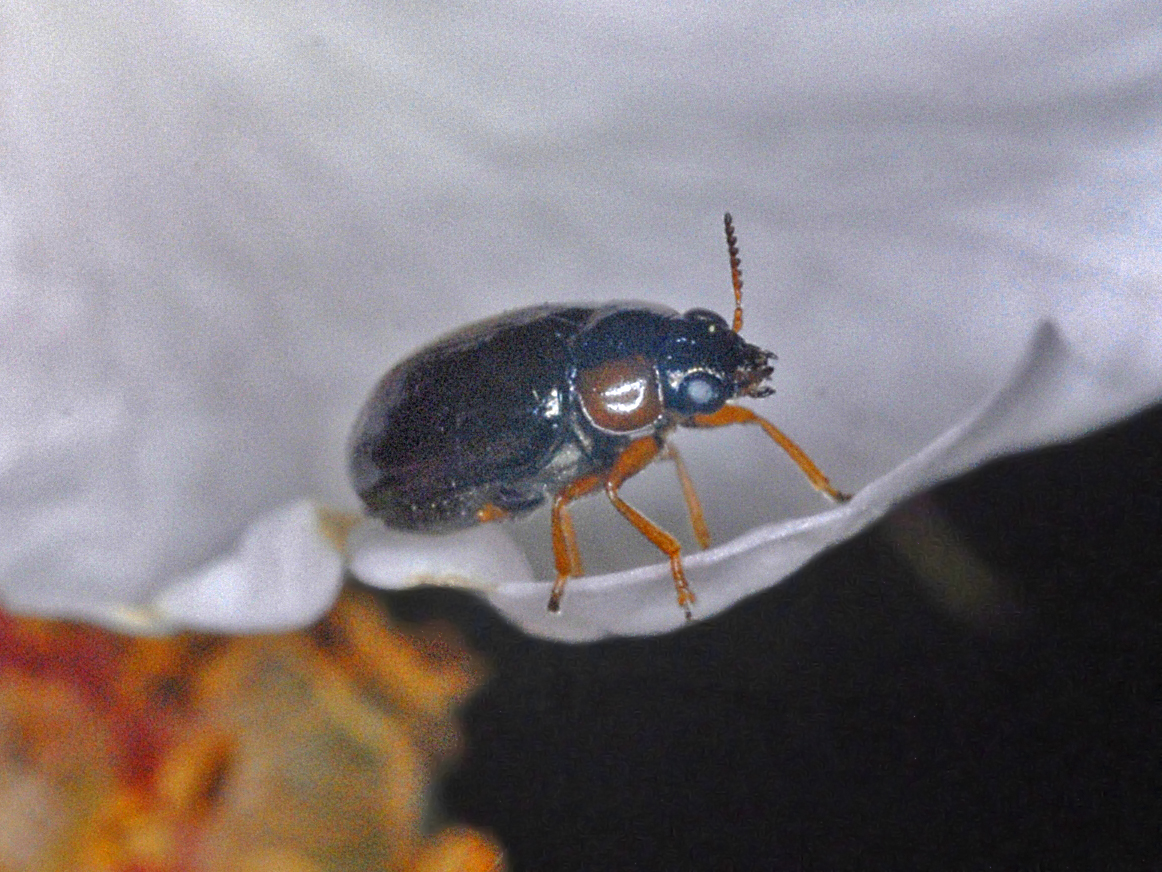
- Adult of Smaragdina affinis

Scientific classification
- Kingdom: Animalia
- Phylum: Arthropoda
- Clade: Pancrustacea
- Class: Insecta
- Order: Coleoptera
- Suborder: Polyphaga
- Infraorder: Cucujiformia
- Family: Chrysomelidae
- Subfamily: Cryptocephalinae
- Tribe: Clytrini
- Genus: Smaragdina
- Species: S. affinis

Binomial name
- Smaragdina affinis (Illiger, 1794)

= Smaragdina affinis =

Species of beetle

Smaragdina affinis is a species of short-horned leaf beetles belonging to the family Chrysomelidae, subfamily Cryptocephalinae.

== Subspecies ==
- Smaragdina affinis affinis (Illiger, 1794)
- Smaragdina affinis manicata (Lacordaire, 1848) - in Spain

== Description ==
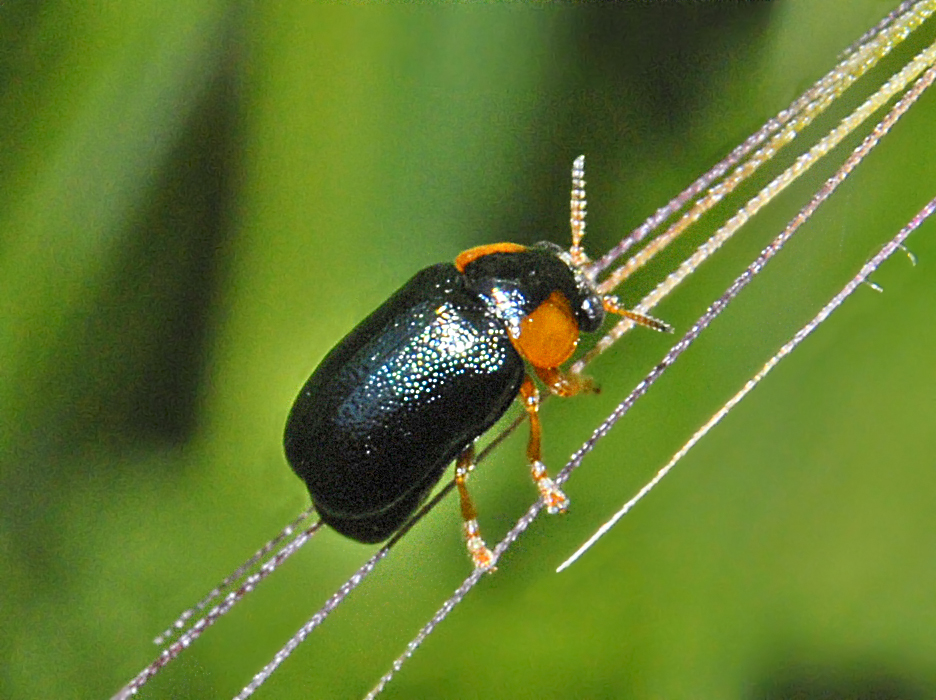
Smaragdina affinis, dorsal view

The adults are 3.5–4 millimetres (0.14–0.16 in) long. Head is shiny black. Elytrae are black, with bluish reflections. Pronotum is edged with orange-red or red-brown, while the disc is black. Pronotum shows a fine and sparse punctuation, with strong and dense punctuation on the elytrae. Tibia and tarsi are orange. Femurs are hardly darkened at the base.

== Biology ==
Adults mainly feed on leaves of Corylus avellana, Quercus and Crataegus species, while larvae possibly feed in leaf litter.

== Distribution ==
These leaf beetles are present in most of Europe.

== Habitat ==
These leaf beetles are heat-loving. They can be found predominantly in thickets and forest edges, in the plane or on dry warm slopes, from about April to July.
