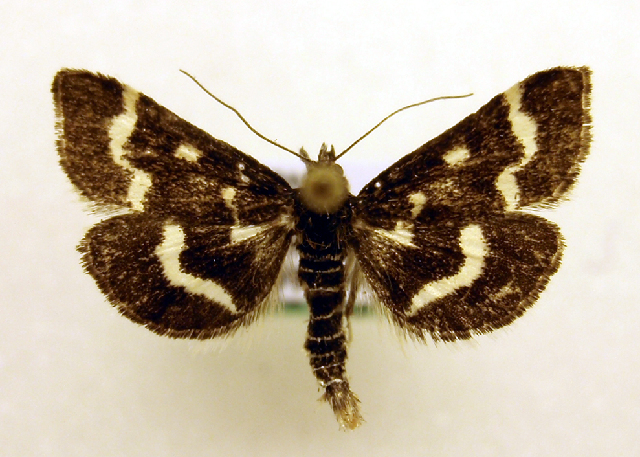

Scientific classification
- Domain: Eukaryota
- Kingdom: Animalia
- Phylum: Arthropoda
- Class: Insecta
- Order: Lepidoptera
- Family: Crambidae
- Genus: Pyrausta
- Species: P. nigrata

Binomial name
- Pyrausta nigrata (Scopoli, 1763)

Synonyms
- Pyralis anguinalis Hübner, 1796; Pyralis fascialis Schrank, 1802; Tinea funigera Fourcroy, 1785

= Pyrausta nigrata =

Species of moth

Pyrausta nigrata is a species of moth of the family Crambidae. It was described by Giovanni Antonio Scopoli in his 1763 Entomologia Carniolica and it is found in Europe.

The wingspan is 14–17 mm (0.55–0.67 in). The moth flies from June to October depending on the location.

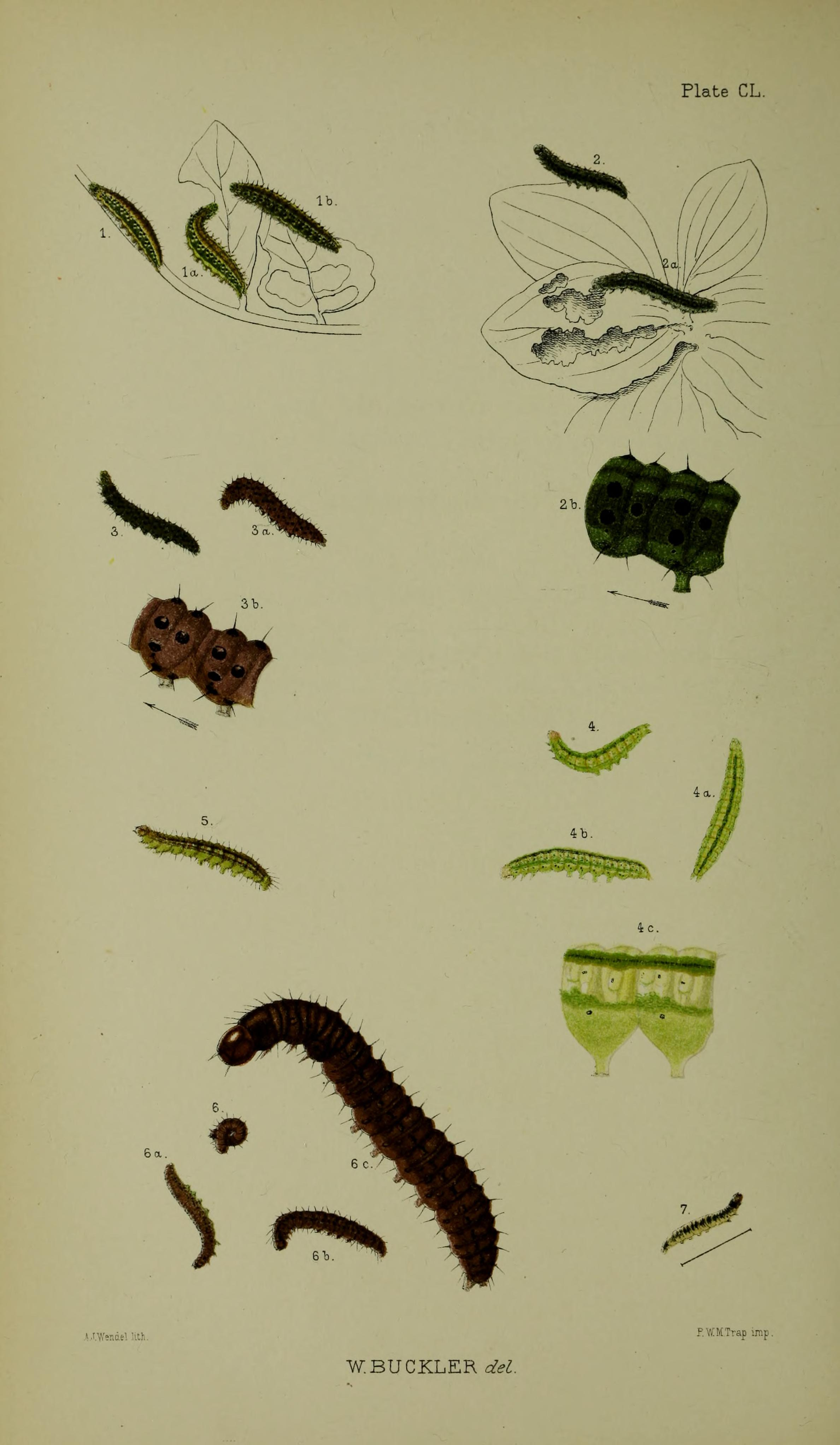
Figs. 3, 3a larvae in various stages of growth 3b enlargement of two segments

The larvae feed on various herbs, such as thyme and marjoram.
