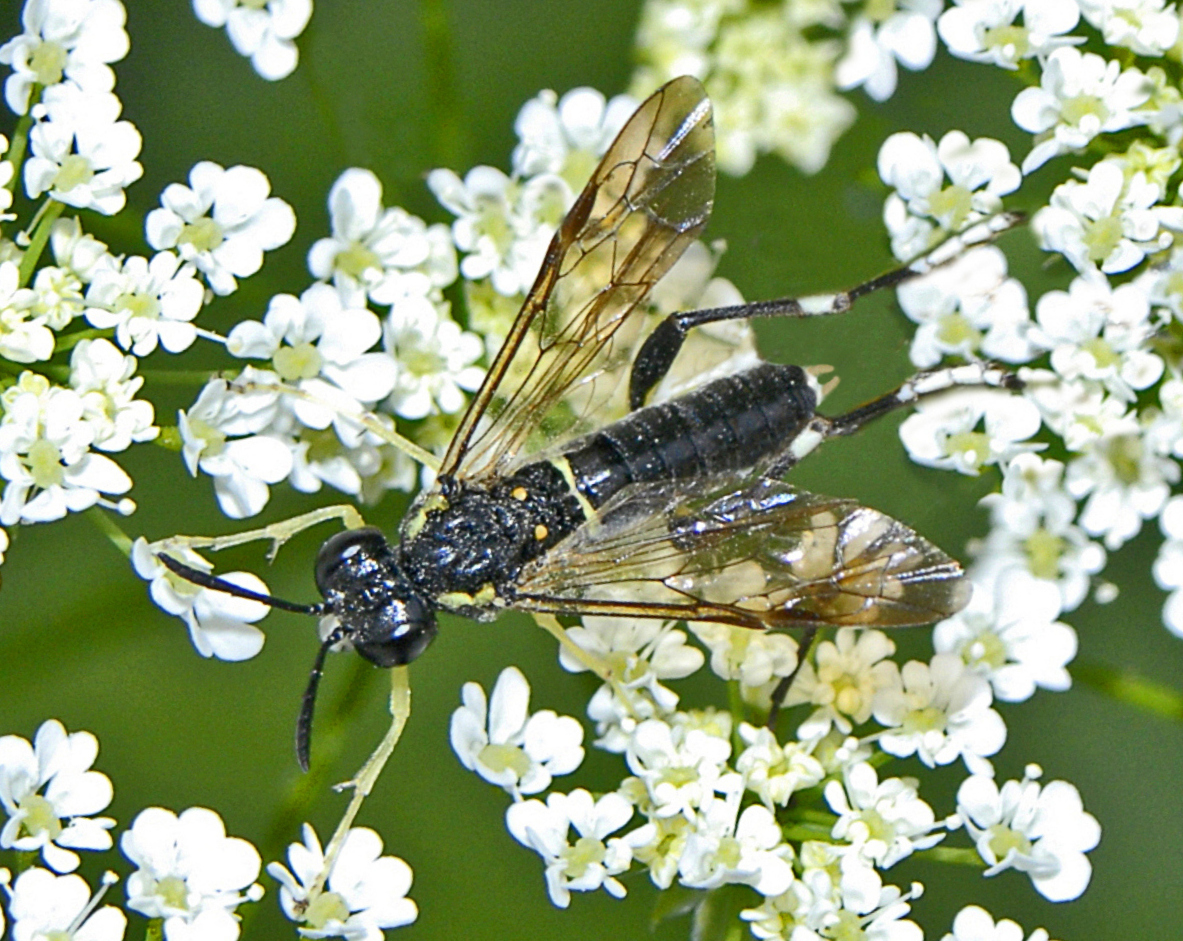
- Macrophya montana. Male
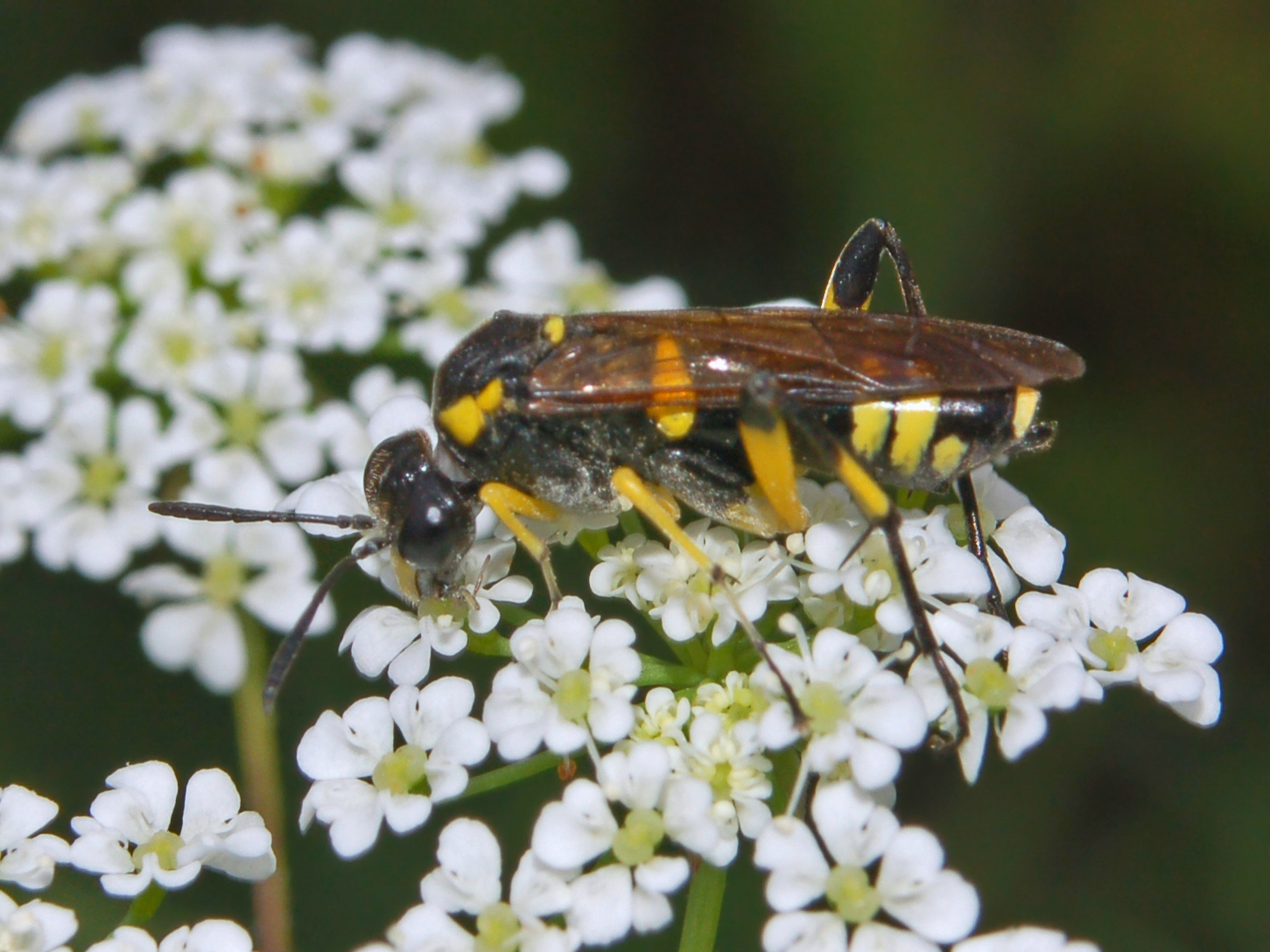
- Female

Scientific classification
- Domain: Eukaryota
- Kingdom: Animalia
- Phylum: Arthropoda
- Class: Insecta
- Order: Hymenoptera
- Suborder: Symphyta
- Family: Tenthredinidae
- Genus: Macrophya
- Species: M. montana

Binomial name
- Macrophya montana (Scopoli, 1763)

= Macrophya montana =

Species of sawfly

Macrophya montana is a sawfly (order Hymenoptera, family Tenthredinidae).

== Distribution ==
This common species is widespread in most of Europe and it is also present in North Africa, Turkey and Iran.

== Habitat ==
It prefers forest edges, thickets and slopes and occurs in a wide range of elevations above sea level.

== Description ==
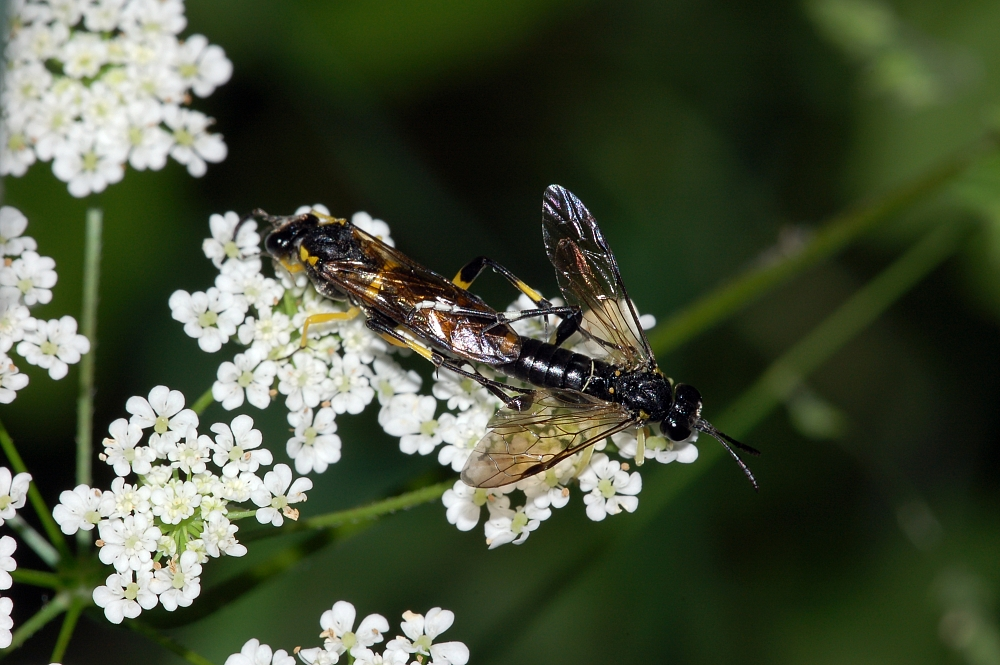
Mating couple: the female to the left, the male to the right with the wings spread out

Macrophya montana can reach a length of 8-12mm. This species shows an evident sexual dimorphism.

The females are recognisable by black and yellow markings. The head is black with yellow clypeus and labrum. On the abdomen the first tergite is completely yellow, the fifth and sixth are broad, yellow, interrupted in the middle. On the seventh, sometimes also on the fourth, there are small yellow spots on the sides. Also the ninth tergite is yellow. These markings are absent on the abdomen of the males, that are completely black.

In the females the legs are predominantly yellow with black markings. In the males the first two pairs of legs are pale yellow, while the hind legs are mainly black, but the tips of the tibias and part of tarsi are white.

== Biology ==
The adults of this sawfly can mostly be encountered from May through July. Adults mainly feed on pollen and nectar, especially on Heracleum sphondylium, but they feed also on honeydew and small insects. The larvae are monophagous and develop on the leaves of blackberries and raspberries (Rubus fruticosus).
