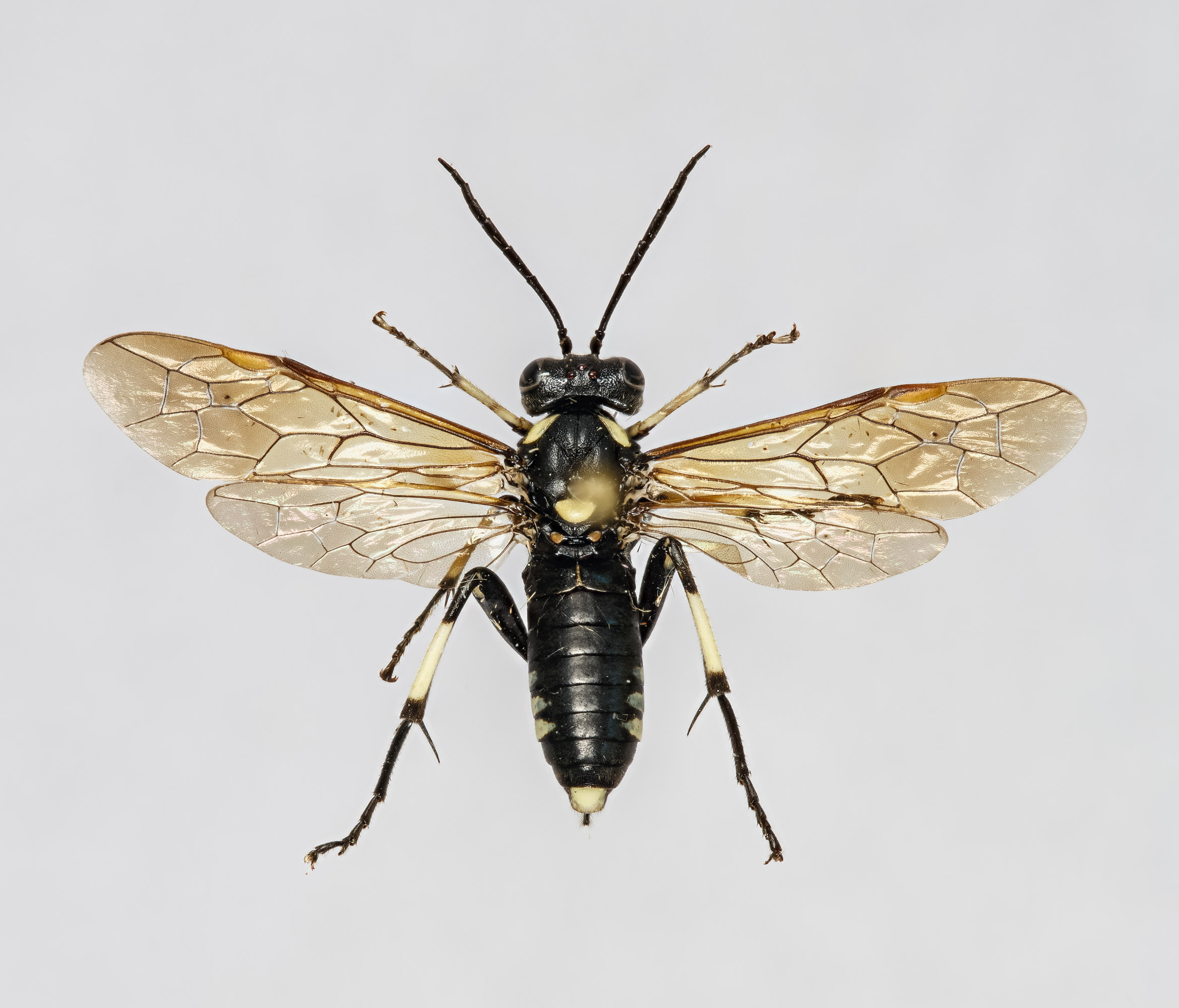
- Macrophya duodecimpunctata Norway

Scientific classification
- Kingdom: Animalia
- Phylum: Arthropoda
- Class: Insecta
- Order: Hymenoptera
- Suborder: Symphyta
- Family: Tenthredinidae
- Genus: Macrophya
- Species: M. duodecimpunctata

Binomial name
- Macrophya duodecimpunctata (Linnaeus, 1758)

= Macrophya duodecimpunctata =

Species of sawfly

Macrophya duodecimpunctata is a Palearctic species of sawfly.
