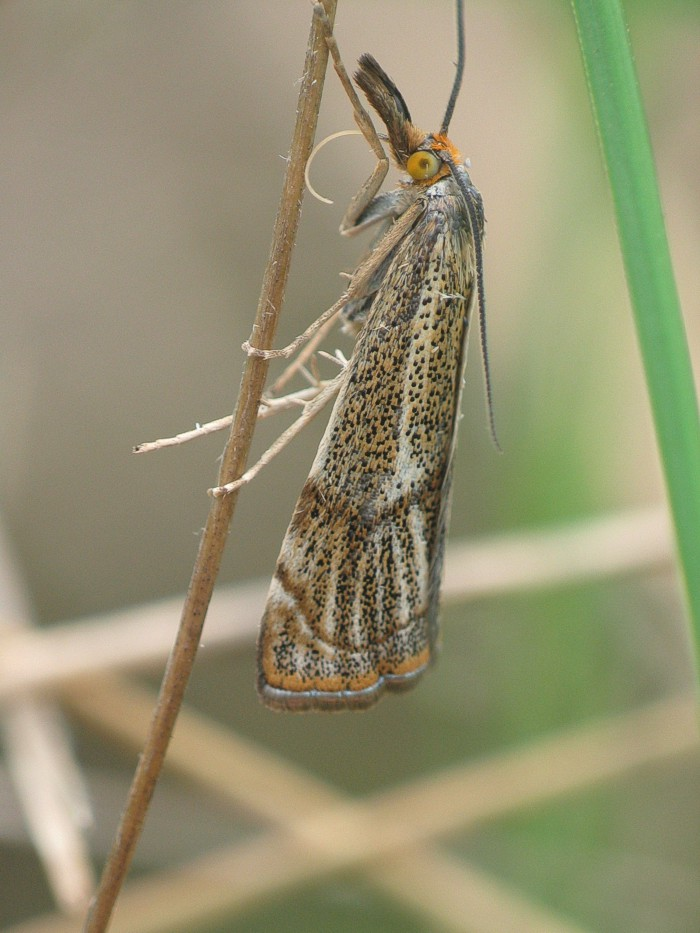

Scientific classification
- Kingdom: Animalia
- Phylum: Arthropoda
- Clade: Pancrustacea
- Class: Insecta
- Order: Lepidoptera
- Family: Crambidae
- Subfamily: Crambinae
- Tribe: Crambini
- Genus: Thisanotia; Hübner, 1825
- Species: T. chrysonuchella

Binomial name
- Thisanotia chrysonuchella (Scopoli, 1763)

Synonyms
- Genus; Thinasotia Heinemann, 1865; Thysanotia J. L. R. Agassiz, 1847; Species; Phalaena chrysonuchella Scopoli, 1763; Phalaena Tinea atomella O. F. Müller, 1764; Tinea campella Hübner, 1793; Tinea gramella Fabricius, 1781

= Thisanotia =

Genus of moths

Thisanotia is a monotypic genus of moth in the family Crambidae described by Jacob Hübner in 1825. Its single species, Thisanotia chrysonuchella, described by Giovanni Antonio Scopoli in his 1763 Entomologia Carniolica, is found in Europe.

== Description ==
The wingspan is 24–34 mm. The forewings are ferruginous- brown, clearly irrorated with black; veins and costal edge marked with rather undefined white streaks; median line thick, obtusely angulated, ferruginous-brown; second white, anteriorly edged with ferruginous-brown, rounded -angulated; termen ferruginous- yellow, with some indistinct black dots; cilia metallic. The hindwings are grey.

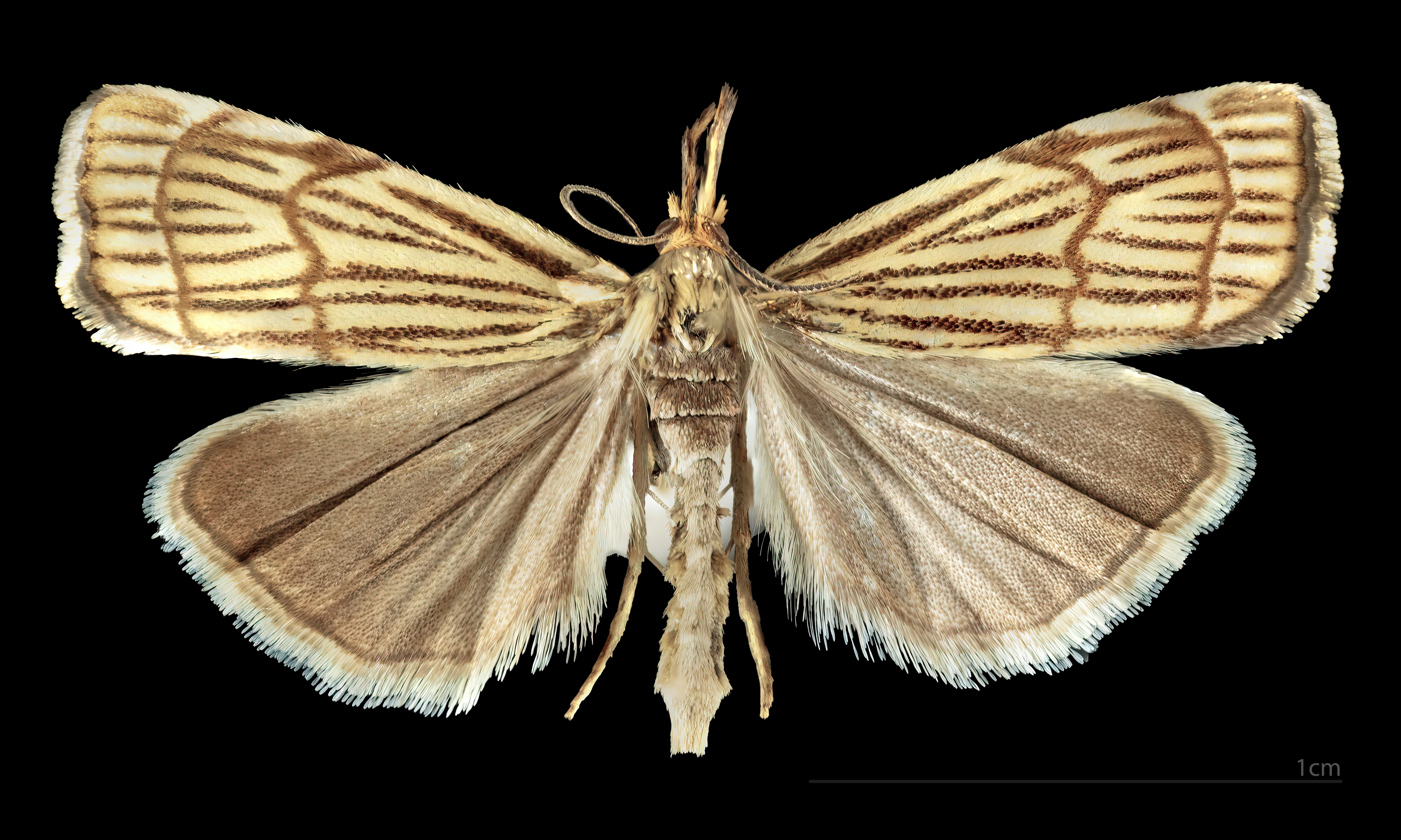
Thisanotia chrysonuchella ♀

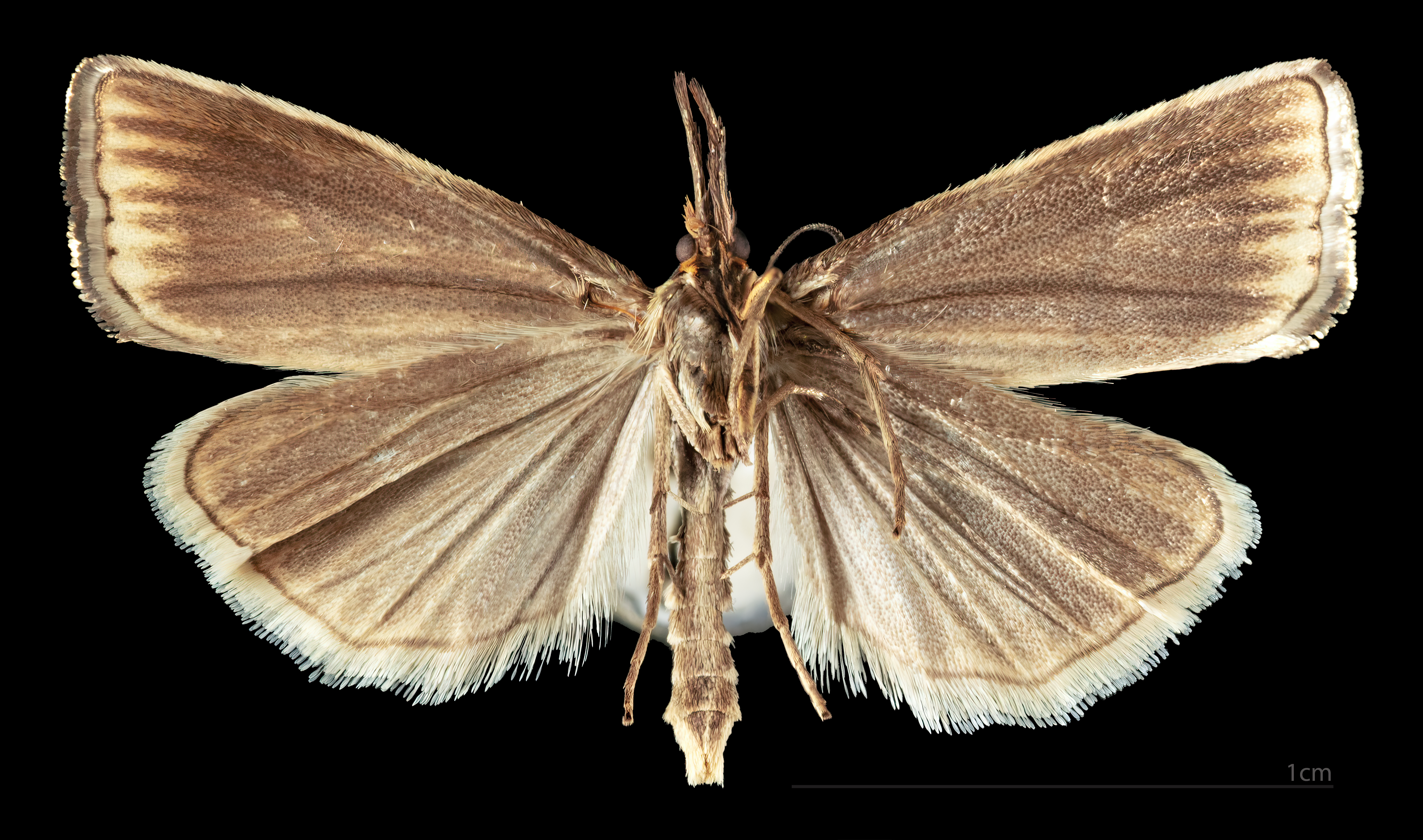
Thisanotia chrysonuchella ♀ △

== Biology ==
The moth flies in one generation from May to June..

The larvae feed on various grasses such as Festuca ovina.

== Subspecies ==
- Thisanotia chrysonuchella chrysonuchella
- Thisanotia chrysonuchella dilutalis (Caradja, 1916)

== Notes ==
1. The flight season refers to Belgium and the Netherlands. This may vary in other parts of the range.
