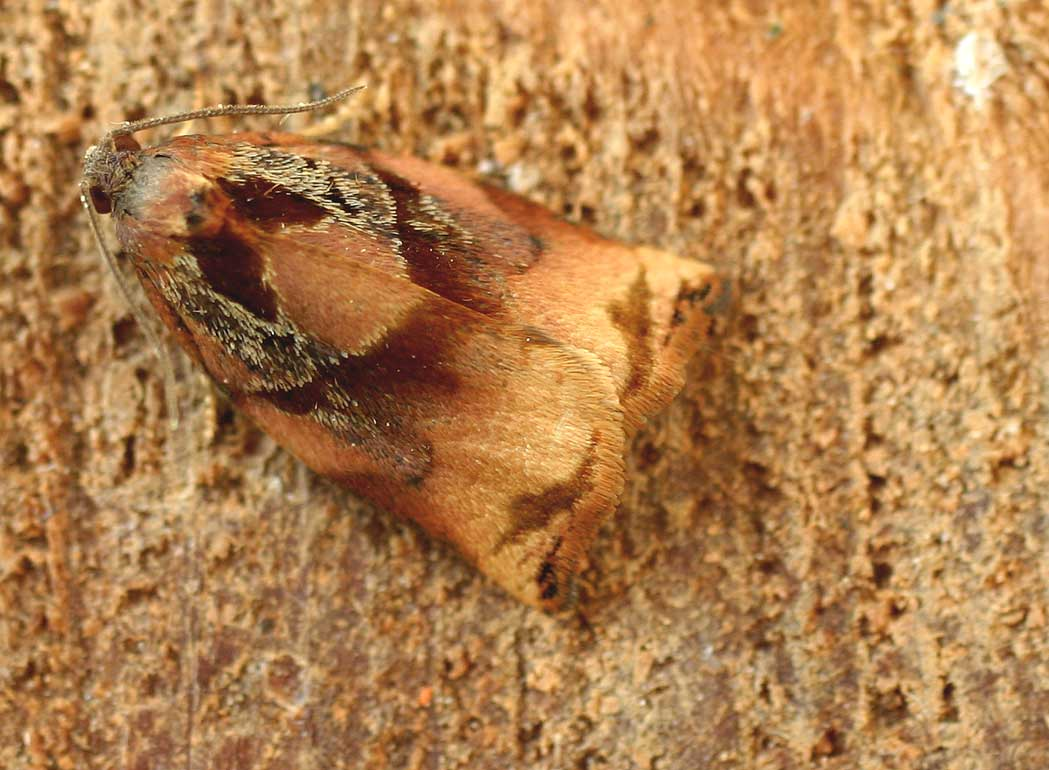
- Male
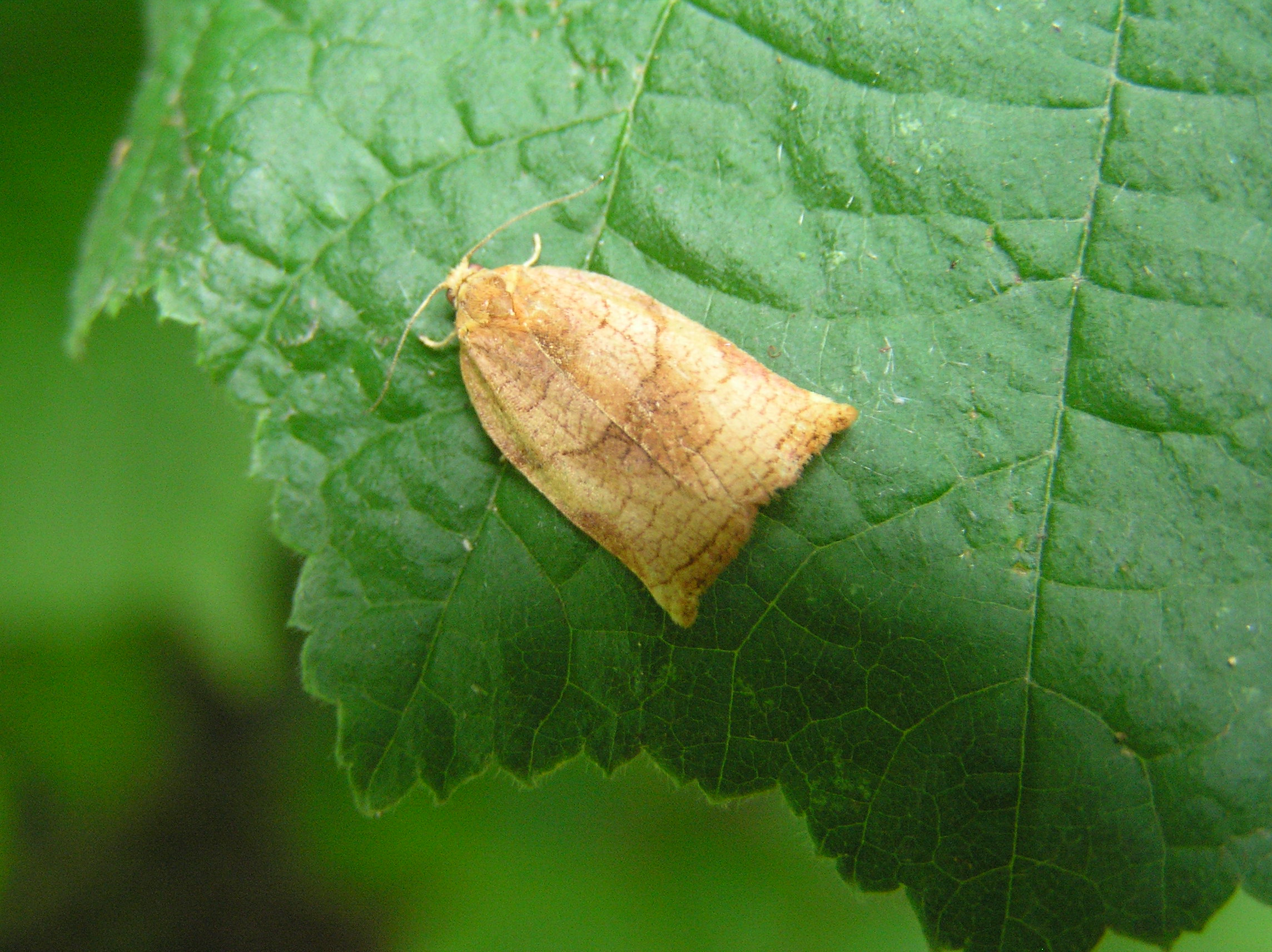
- Archips podana Female

Scientific classification
- Kingdom: Animalia
- Phylum: Arthropoda
- Clade: Pancrustacea
- Class: Insecta
- Order: Lepidoptera
- Family: Tortricidae
- Genus: Archips
- Species: A. podana

Binomial name
- Archips podana (Scopoli, 1763)

Synonyms
- List: Phalaena podana Scopoli, 1763; Cacoecia ameriana Treitschke, 1830; Tortrix congenerana Hubner, [1823-1824]; Tortrix fulvana [Denis & Schiffermuller], 1775; Archips meridana Kozlov & Esartia, 1991; Tortrix pyrastrana Hubner, [1796-1799]; Tortrix podana var. sauberiana Sorhagen, 1882; Tortrix vulpeculana Fuchs, 1903

= Archips podana =

Large fruit-tree tortrix

Fruit tree tortrix moth

Archips podana, the large fruit-tree tortrix, is a moth of the family Tortricidae. The species was first described by Giovanni Antonio Scopoli in his 1763 Entomologia Carniolica. It is found in Europe, Asia from Anatolia to Japan and is an introduced species in North America.

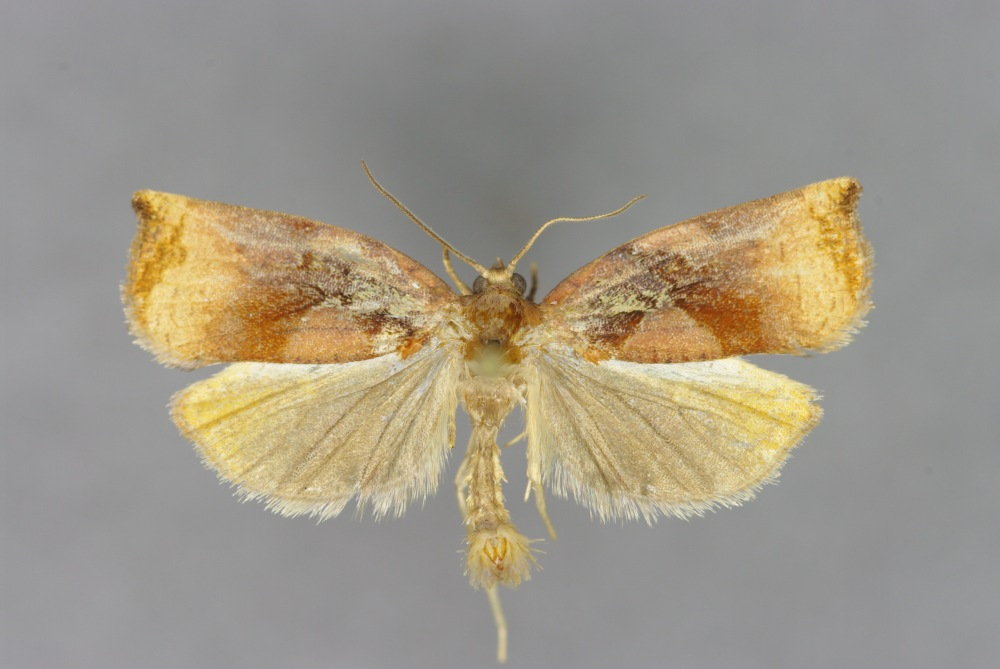

== Description ==
The wingspan is 18–26 mm. The thorax is crested. The forewings have a sinuate vertical termen. The costal fold is short, basal and red-brownish or ochreous, in female strigulated with dark brown. In the male there is a dark red-brown dorsal spot near base, above which is a grey and whitish suffusion. The central fascia in males is dark red -brown, in females brownish or outlined only, anterior edge nearly straight. The costal patch, an apical terminal mark, and a stria (in male thickened) from tornus are all dark red-brown. The hindwings are grey, the apex broadly orange. The larva is green; dorsal line sometimes darker; head and plate of 2 brown or black: Julius von Kennel provides a full description.

The moth flies in one generation from May to September in western Europe. Flies in the late afternoon and comes to light.

Eggs are laid in several batches of 50 to 100 on the upper surface of a leaf and are covered in a wax-like substance, which closely matches the colour of the leaf. The eggs difficult to find and hatch in 17–23 days. Larvae can be found from July to early May and are polyphagous, feeding on trees and shrubs, such as apple (Malus species), pear (Pyrus species), cherry (Prunus species), plum (Prunus species) and sometimes conifers (Coniferae). Larvae feed on both surfaces of the leaf for a few days, before dispersing, when they spin a fine web and feed on the underside of a leaf. On first ecdysis, the larvae feed on the skin of the fruit, spinning a leaf for shelter. They continue to feed until the fruit is picked, or falls to the ground, and overwinter in a silken hibernaculum on a twig. In the spring, as a fourth instar, they feed on the opening buds, often boring into them, and later between two or more spun leaves. They pupate in the larval habitation.
