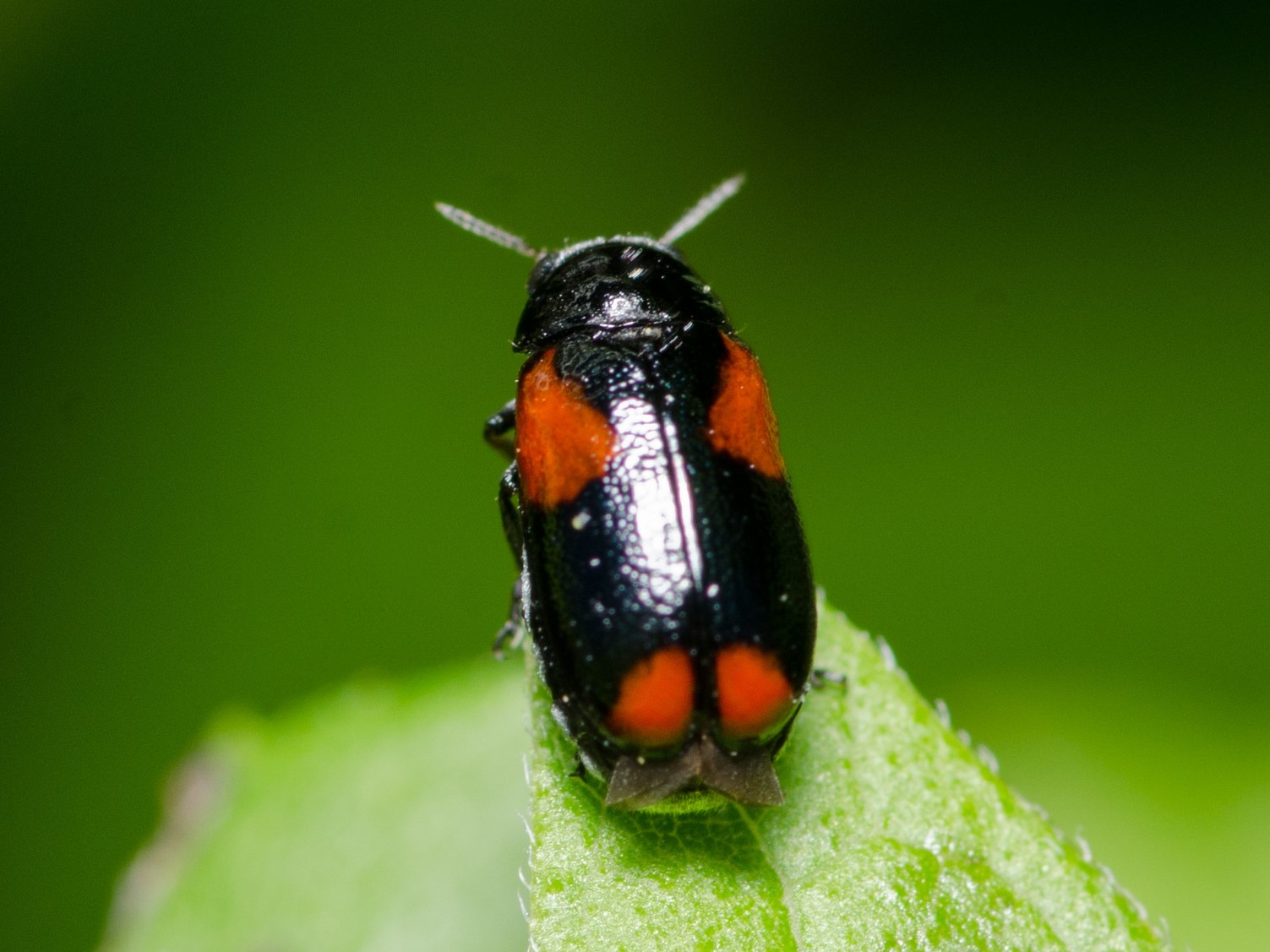

Scientific classification
- Kingdom: Animalia
- Phylum: Arthropoda
- Clade: Pancrustacea
- Class: Insecta
- Order: Coleoptera
- Suborder: Polyphaga
- Infraorder: Cucujiformia
- Family: Chrysomelidae
- Genus: Smaragdina
- Species: S. militaris

Binomial name
- Smaragdina militaris (J. L. LeConte, 1858)

= Smaragdina militaris =

Species of beetle

Smaragdina militaris is a species of case-bearing leaf beetle in the family Chrysomelidae. It is found in North America.

== Subspecies ==
These two subspecies belong to the species Smaragdina militaris:

- Smaragdina militaris arizonica (Schaeffer, 1920)^{i c g}
- Smaragdina militaris militaris (J. L. LeConte, 1858)^{i c g}

Data sources: i = ITIS, c = Catalogue of Life, g = GBIF, b = Bugguide.net
