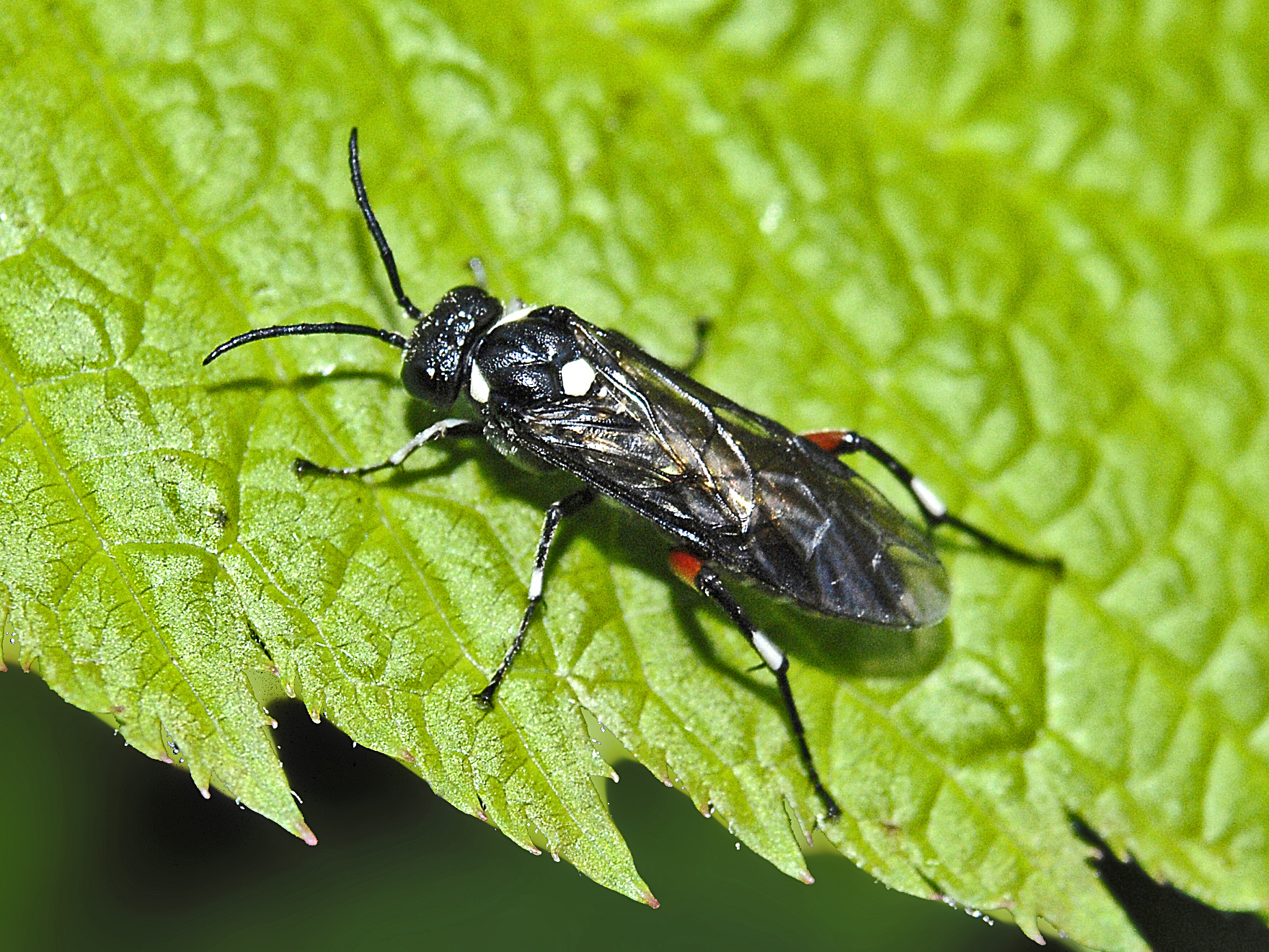
- Female of Macrophya punctumalbum

Scientific classification
- Kingdom: Animalia
- Phylum: Arthropoda
- Class: Insecta
- Order: Hymenoptera
- Suborder: Symphyta
- Family: Tenthredinidae
- Genus: Macrophya
- Species: M. punctumalbum

Binomial name
- Macrophya punctumalbum (Linnaeus, 1767)

= Macrophya punctumalbum =

Species of sawfly

Macrophya punctumalbum, the privet sawfly, is a sawfly (order Hymenoptera, family Tenthredinidae).

== Description ==
Macrophya punctumalbum can reach a length of 10 millimetres (0.4 in). In the females the basic body color is black. Legs have bright, red hind femora, while tibias are black with white apex. Tergites shows three to seven white spots on both sides. There is a large white spot over most of the scutellum.

This species shows an evident sexual dimorphism. Males are much smaller than the females and completely black. They are very rare, because the species is substantially parthenogenetic.

The larvae develop on the leaves of Oleaceae species (Fraxinus, Ligustrum, Syringa).

The adults of this sawfly can mostly be encountered from May through July. Adults mainly feed on pollen and nectar.

== Distribution ==
This species is widespread in most of Europe up to the Caucasus.

== Bibliography ==
- Hoebeke, E R and Johnson, W T A European privet sawfly, Macrophya punctumalbum (L.): North American distribution host plants, seasonal history and descriptions of the immature stages (Hymenoptera: Tenthredinidae) Proceedings of the Entomological Society of Washington
