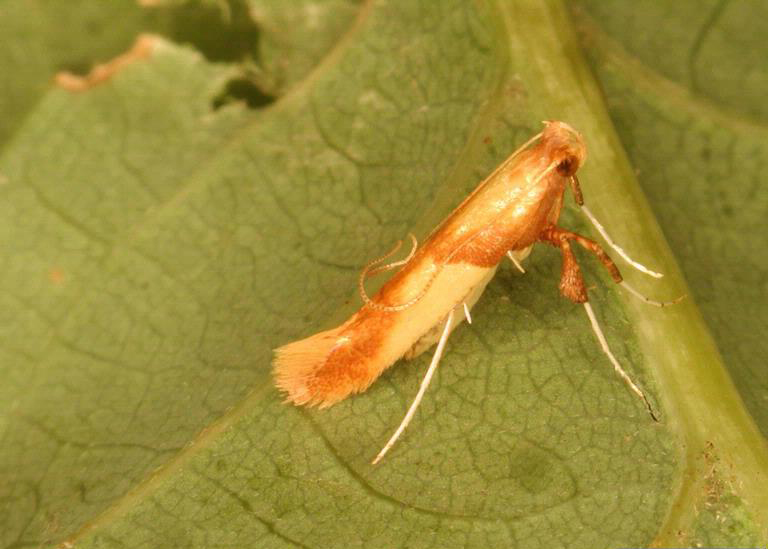

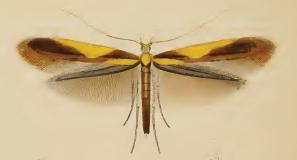

Scientific classification
- Domain: Eukaryota
- Kingdom: Animalia
- Phylum: Arthropoda
- Class: Insecta
- Order: Lepidoptera
- Family: Gracillariidae
- Genus: Caloptilia
- Species: C. alchimiella

Binomial name
- Caloptilia alchimiella (Scopoli, 1763)

= Caloptilia alchimiella =

Yellow-triangle slender

Species of moth

Caloptilia alchimiella (commonly known as yellow-triangle slender) is a moth of the family Gracillariidae. It is found in Europe and the Near East.

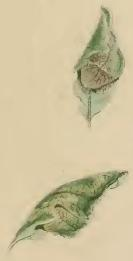
Oak leaves rolled into a conical form by the larva

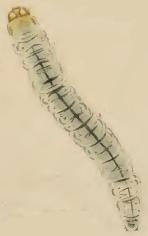
Larva

The wingspan is 10–13 millimetres (0.39–0.51 in). Forewings purplish - ferruginous; dorsum suffused with yellow towards base; a large triangular yellow median costal blotch, apex often rounded. Hindwings dark grey. .

The moth flies from May to July depending on the location.

The larvae feed on Quercus species, Castanea sativa and Fagus sylvatica.
