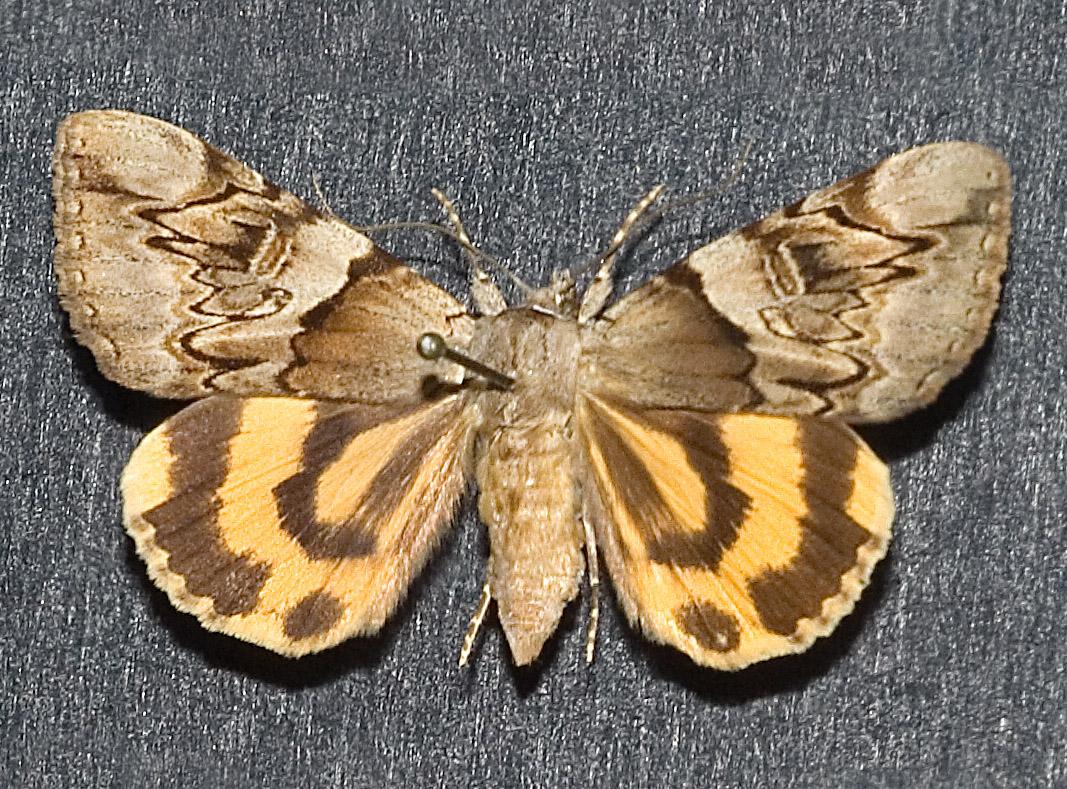

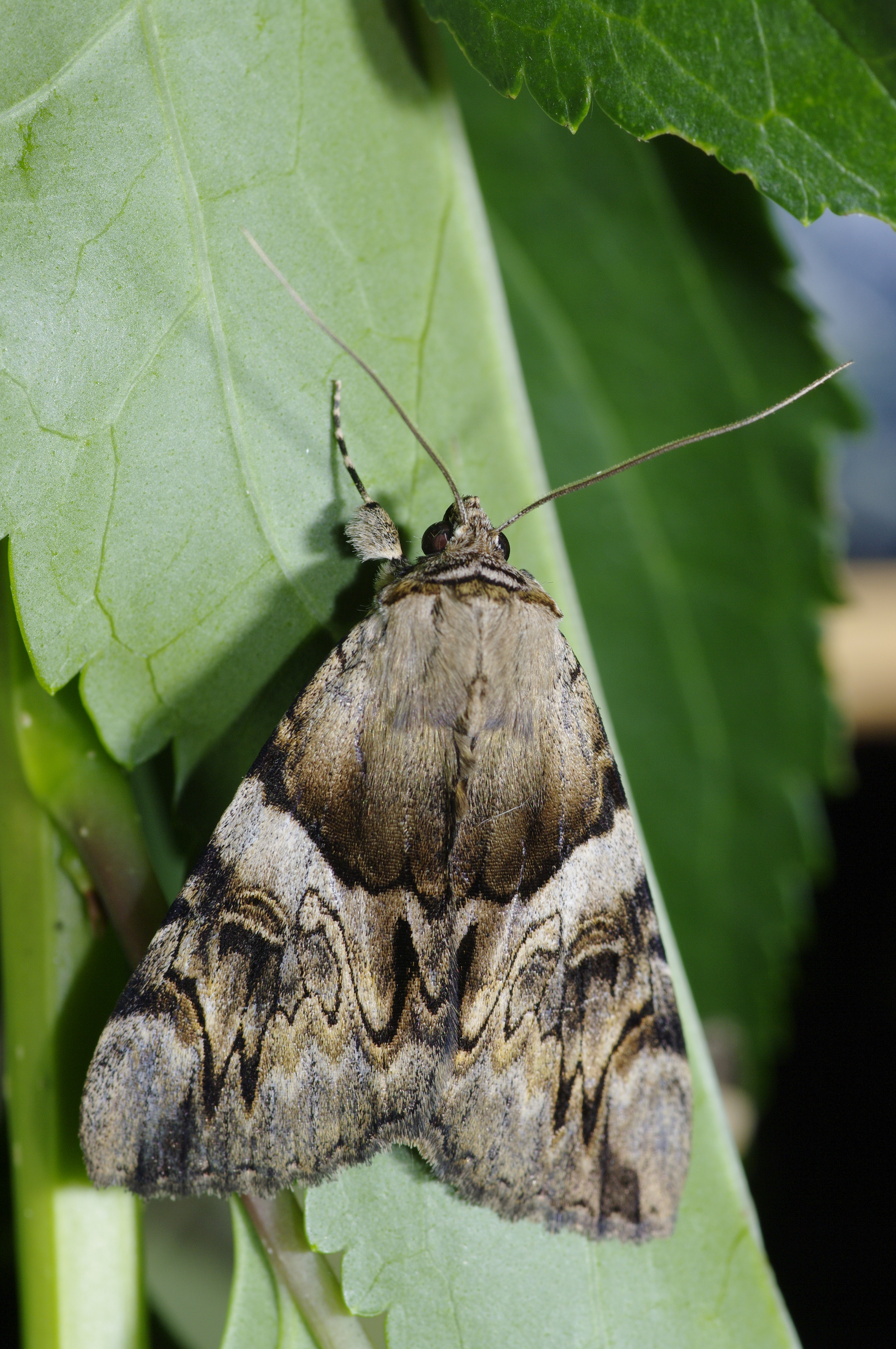

Scientific classification
- Kingdom: Animalia
- Phylum: Arthropoda
- Class: Insecta
- Order: Lepidoptera
- Superfamily: Noctuoidea
- Family: Erebidae
- Genus: Catocala
- Species: C. fulminea

Binomial name
- Catocala fulminea (Scopoli, 1763)

Synonyms
- Phalaena fulminea Scopoli, 1763; Phalanx manturna Hufnagel, 1766; Phalaena paranympha Linnaeus, 1767; Catocala xarippe Butler, 1877; Ephesia fulminea chekiangensis Mell, 1933; Catocala invisa Leech, 1900; Catocala invisa meli Ishizuka, 2001; Catocala fulminea tungus Ishizuka, 2009

= Catocala fulminea =

Species of moth

Catocala fulminea, the yellow bands underwing, is a moth of the family Erebidae. The species was first described by Giovanni Antonio Scopoli in his 1763 Entomologia Carniolica. It is found in central and southern Europe, east Asia and Siberia. The xarippe lineage has been proposed to be a distinct and valid species in its own right, instead of being only subspecifically distinct.

The wingspan is 44–52 mm.

The larvae feed on Prunus, Crataegus, pears, and oaks.

== Subspecies ==
- Catocala fulminea fulminea
- Catocala fulminea chekiangensis (Mell, 1933)
- Catocala fulminea kamuifuchi Ishizuka, 2009 (Japan: Hokkaido)
