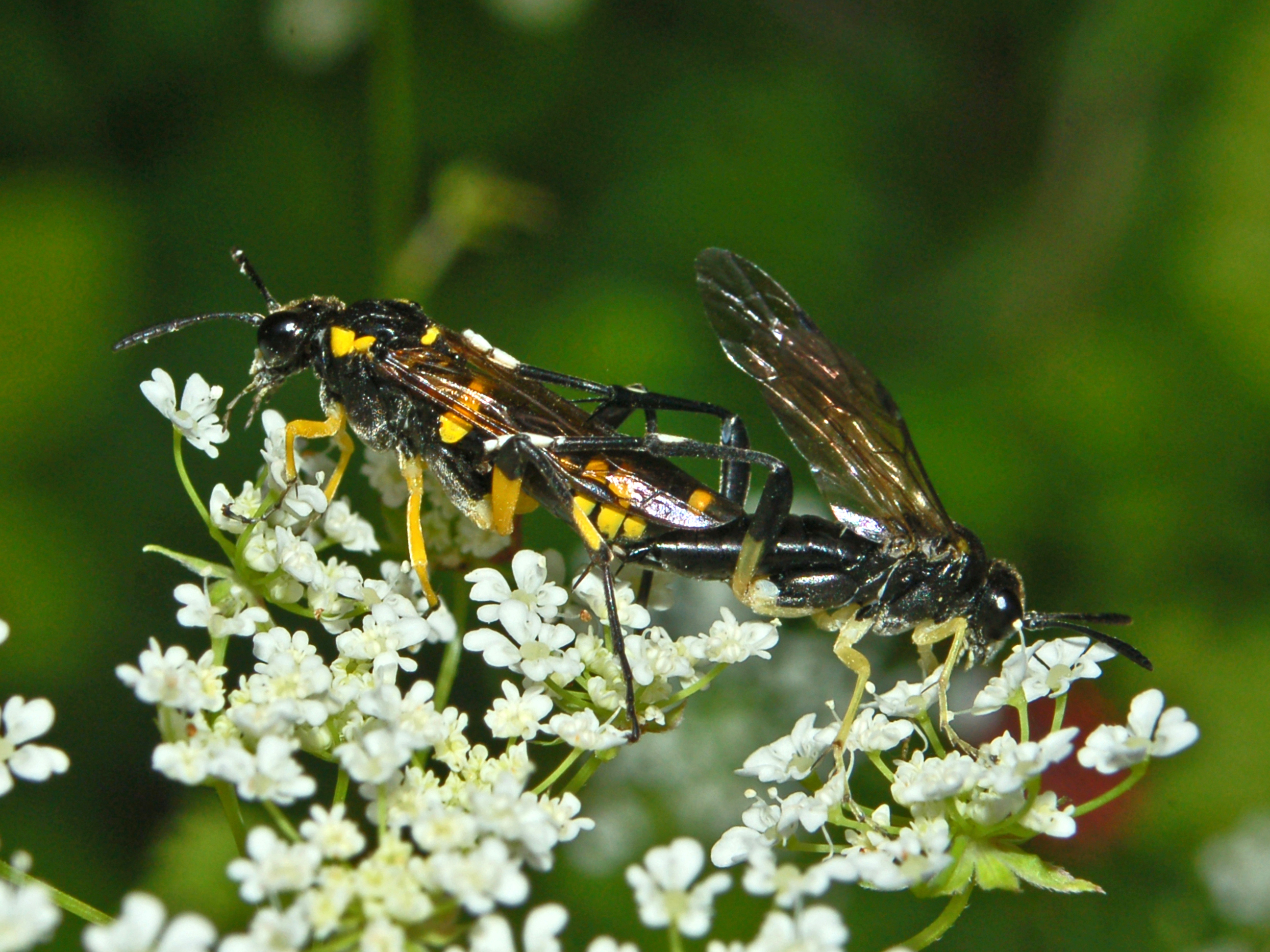
- Macrophya montana. Mating couple

Scientific classification
- Kingdom: Animalia
- Phylum: Arthropoda
- Class: Insecta
- Order: Hymenoptera
- Suborder: Symphyta
- Family: Tenthredinidae
- Subfamily: Tenthredininae
- Genus: Macrophya; Dahlbom, 1835

= Macrophya =

Genus of sawflies

Macrophya is a genus of sawfly (order Hymenoptera, family Tenthredinidae).

== Species ==
- Macrophya albicincta (Schrank, 1776)
- Macrophya albipuncta (Fallén, 1808)
- Macrophya alboannulata A. Costa, 1859
- Macrophya annulata (Geoffroy in Fourcroy, 1785)
- Macrophya annulicornis Konow, 1904
- Macrophya annulitibia Takeuchi, 1933
- Macrophya aphrodit e Benson, 1954
- Macrophya apicalis F. Smith, 1874
- Macrophya blanda (Fabricius, 1775)
- Macrophya carbonaria F. Smith, 1874
- Macrophya carinthiaca (Klug, 1814)
- Macrophya chrysura (Klug, 1817)
- Macrophya crassula (Klug, 1814)
- Macrophya crassuliformis Forsius, 1925
- Macrophya cyrus Benson, 1954
- Macrophya diversipes (Schrank, 1782)
- Macrophya duodecimpunctata (Linnaeus, 1758)
- Macrophya enslini Forsius, 1925
- Macrophya erythrocnema Costa, 1859
- Macrophya erythrogaster (Spinola, 1843)
- Macrophya esakii (Takeuchi, 1923)
- Macrophya falsifica Mocsary, 1909
- Macrophya forsiusi Takeuchi, 1937
- Macrophya hispana Konow, 1904
- Macrophya ignava F. Smith, 1874
- Macrophya imitator Takeuchi, 1937
- Macrophya infumata Rohwer, 1925
- Macrophya kisuji Togashi, 1974
- Macrophya koreana Takeuchi, 1937
- Macrophya liukiuana Takeuchi, 1926
- Macrophya maculitibia Takeuchi, 1933
- Macrophya malaisei Takeuchi, 1937
- Macrophya marlatti Zhelochovtsev, 1934
- Macrophya mikagei Togashi, 2005
- Macrophya militaris (Klug, 1814)
- Macrophya minerva Benson, 1968
- Macrophya montana (Scopoli, 1763)
- Macrophya obesa Takeuchi, 1933
- Macrophya parvula Konow, 1884
- Macrophya postica (Brullé, 1832)
- Macrophya punctumalbum (Linnaeus, 1767)
- Macrophya recognata Zombori, 1979
- Macrophya ribis (Schrank, 1781)
- Macrophya rohweri Forsius, 1925
- Macrophya rufipes (Linnaeus, 1758)
- Macrophya rufopicta Enslin, 1910
- Macrophya sanguinolenta (Gmelin in Linnaeus, 1790)
- Macrophya superba Tischbein, 1852
- Macrophya tenella Mocsáry, 1881
- Macrophya teutona (Panzer, 1799)
- Macrophya tibialis Mocsáry, 1881
- Macrophya timida F. Smith, 1874
- Macrophya tricoloripes Mocsáry, 1881
- Macrophya vitta Enslin, 1910
