= Entomologia Carniolica =

1763 taxonomic work by Giovanni Antonio Scopoli

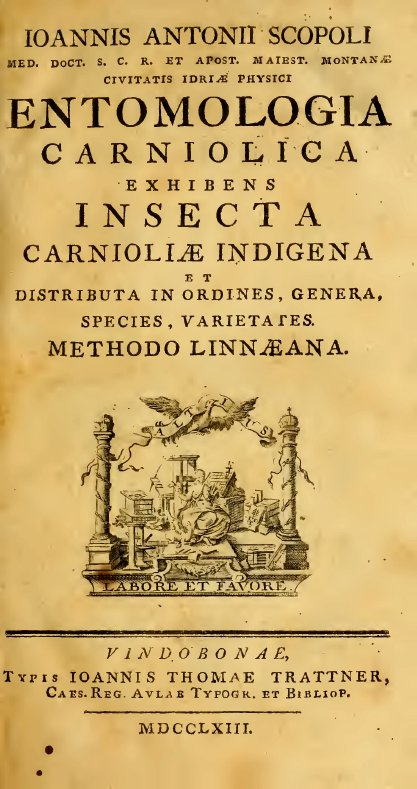
Frontispiece of Entomologia Carniolica

Entomologia Carniolica exhibens insecta Carnioliae indigena et distributa in ordines, genera, species, varietates is a taxonomic work by Giovanni Antonio Scopoli, published in Vienna in 1763. As well as describing hundreds of new species, Entomologia Carniolica contained observations on the species' biology, including the first published account of queen bees mating outside the hive.

== Classification ==
In contrast to his predecessors Carl Linnaeus and Johan Christian Fabricius, who had used the structure of the insect wing and the structure of the insect mouthparts, respectively, as the main means of classifying arthropods, Scopoli favoured a more holistic approach.

In Entomologia Carniolica, Scopoli described 1153 species of "insects" (a term which at that time included many arthropods), divided into seven orders:

Coleoptera (beetles and orthopteroid insects) – species 1–329
Proboscidea (= Hemiptera) – species 330–418
Lepidoptera – species 419–676
Neuroptera – species 677–712
Aculeata (= Hymenoptera) – species 713–838
Halterata (= Diptera) – species 839–1024
Pedestria (various wingless animals, including silverfish, fleas, mites, arachnids, crustaceans and myriapods) – species 1025–1153

== Taxa ==
The animals described in Entomologia Carniolica were found in the Duchy of Carniola (also called the Krain), an area at that time under the control of the Austro-Hungarian Empire. Nowadays, it is the western part of Slovenia.

For each species, Scopoli gave references to previously published illustrations and binomial names. Few works using binomial nomenclature had appeared by 1763; those cited by Scopoli include the 10th edition of Systema Naturae (1758) and Fauna Suecica (1761) by Carl Linnaeus, and Insecta Musei Graecensis (1761) by Nikolaus Poda von Neuhaus. More than half of the species listed by Scopoli in Entomologia Carniolica were described as new. They include:

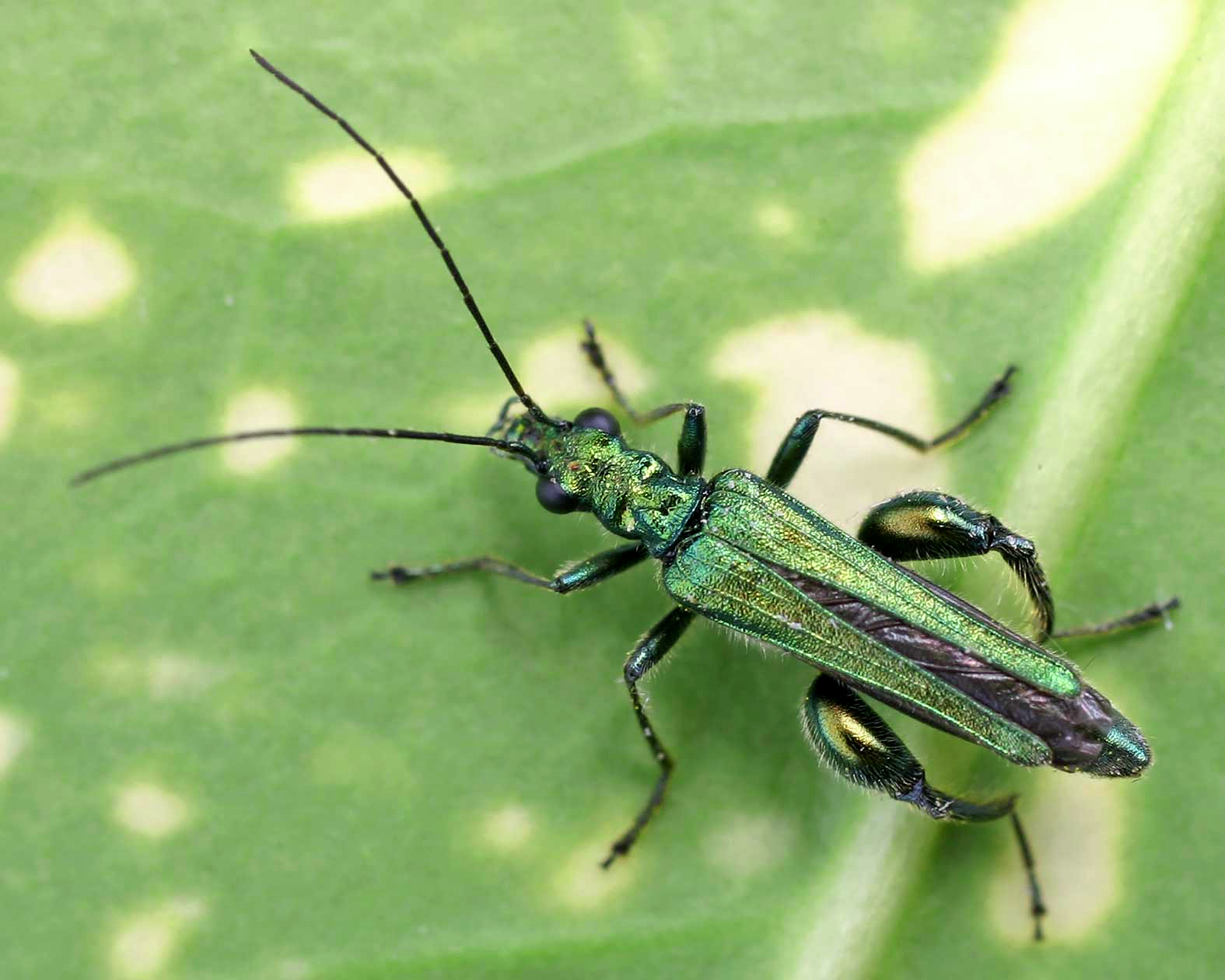
Oedemera nobilis, originally described as Cantharis nobilis

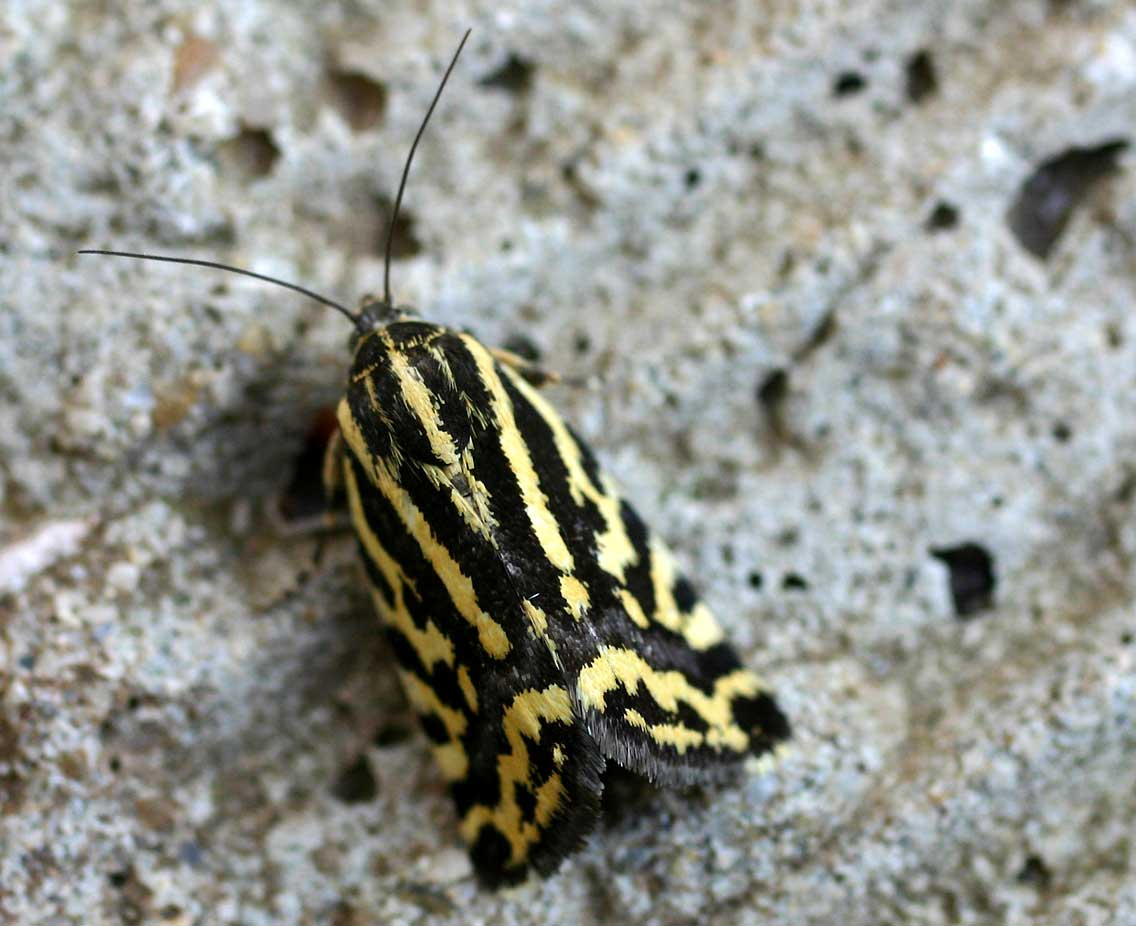
Emmelia trabealis, originally described as Phalaena trabealis

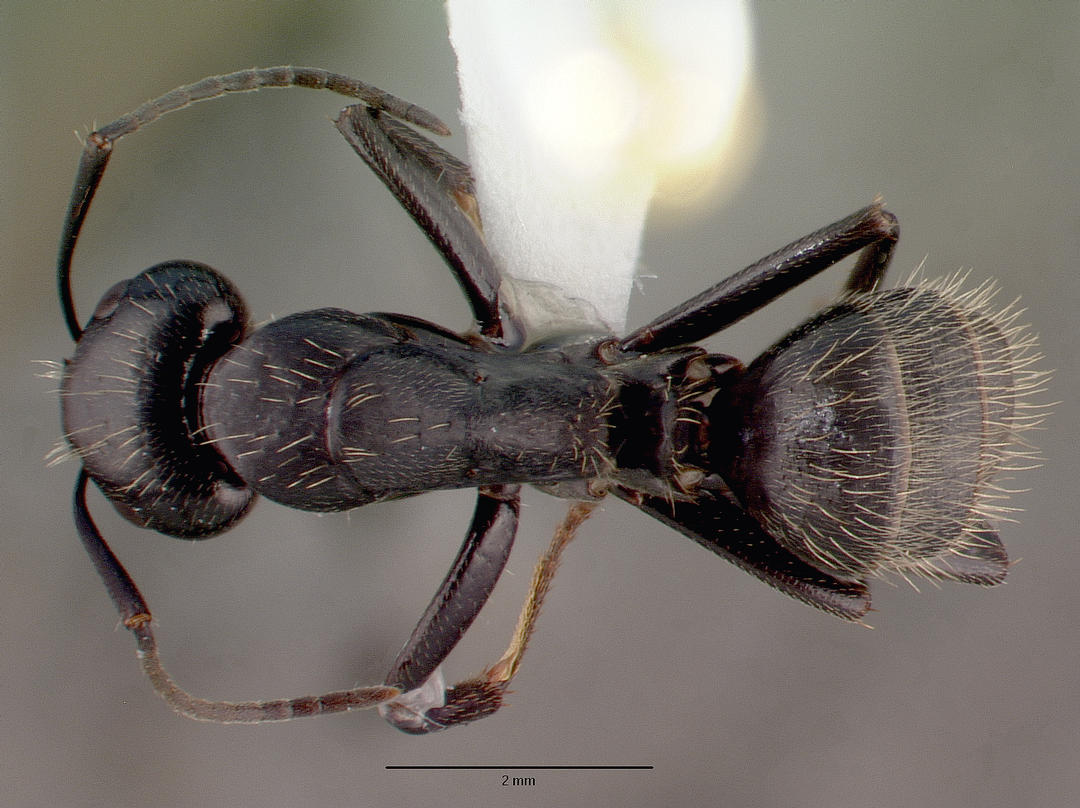
Camponotus vagus, originally described as Formica vaga

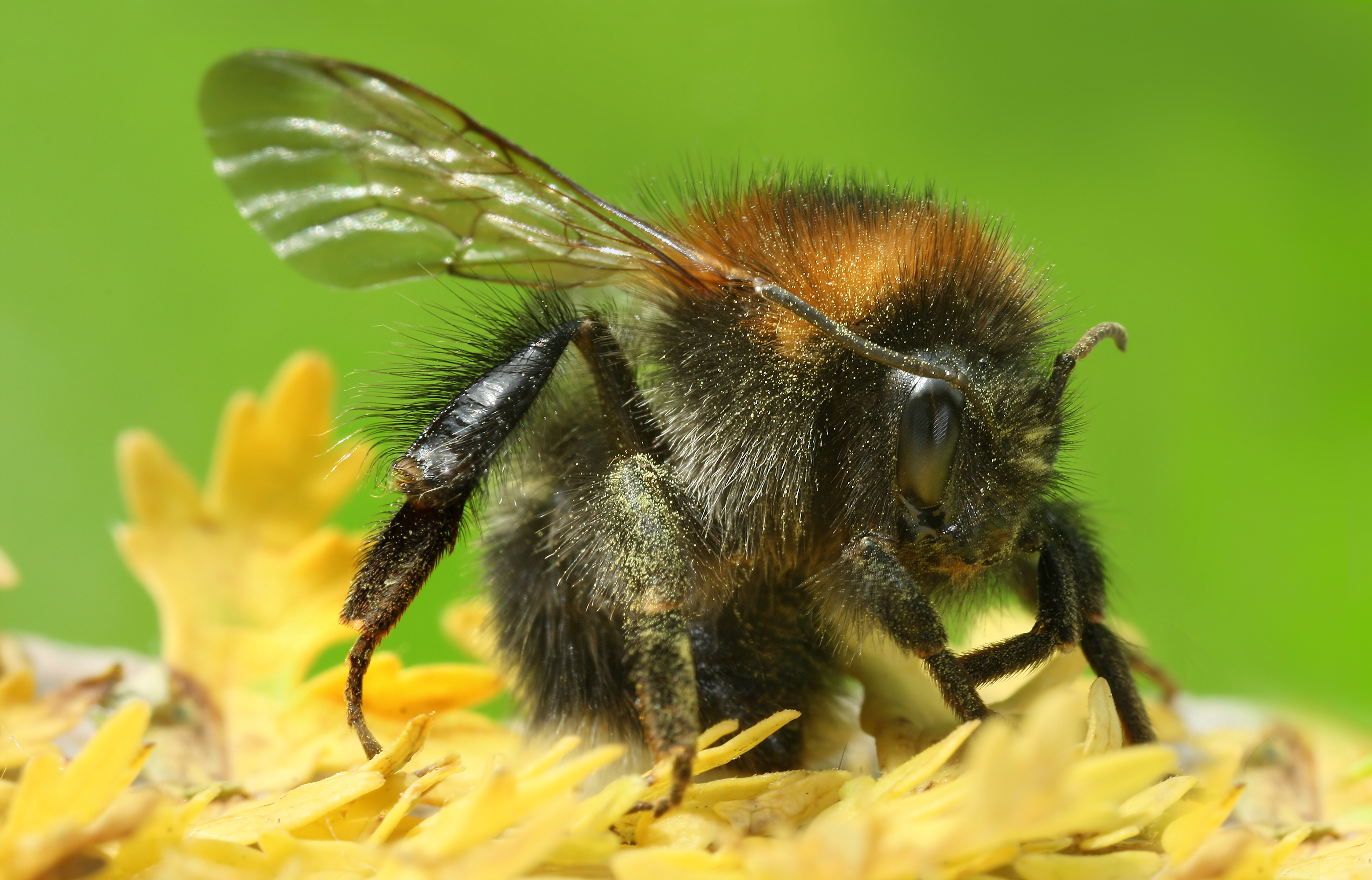
Bombus pascuorum, originally described as Apis pascuorum

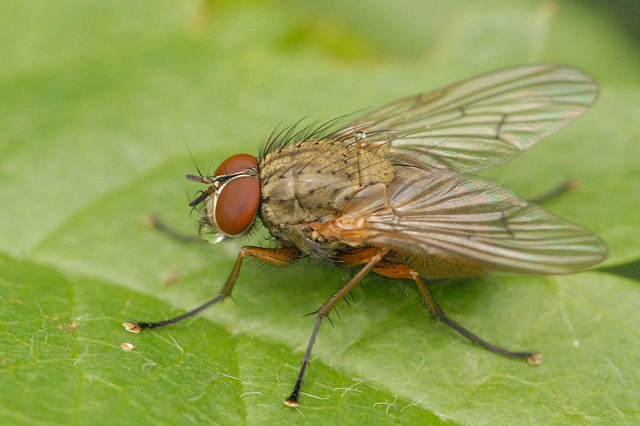
Phaonia angelicae, originally described as Musca angelicae

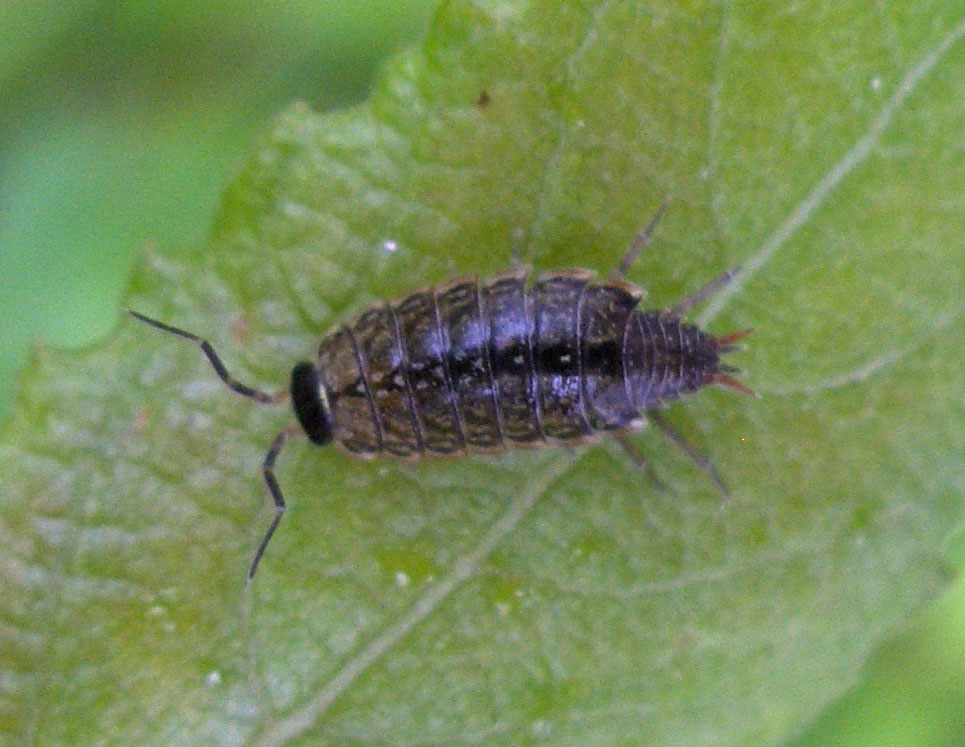
Philoscia muscorum, originally described as Oniscus muscorum

- 15. Scarabæus eremita, now Osmoderma eremita
- 65. Curculio piger, now Cleonus piger
- 97. Curculio glaucus, now Phyllobius glaucus
- 112. Attelabus lilii, now Lilioceris lilii
- 124. Cantharis fulva, now Rhagonycha fulva
- 146. Cantharis nobilis, now Oedemera nobilis
- 199. Buprestis salicina, now Smaragdina salicina
- 264. Carabus catenulatus
- 408. Aphis fabae
- 428. Papilio fagi, now Hipparchia fagi
- 510. Phalaena fulminea, now Catocala fulminea
- 525. Phalaena rubiginosa, now Conistra rubiginosa
- 526. Phalaena clavipalpis, now Paradrina clavipalpis
- 527. Phalaena deceptoria, now Deltote deceptoria
- 532. Phalaena nebulata, now Euchoeca nebulata
- 535. Phalaena fimbrialis, now Thalera fimbrialis
- 537. Phalaena punctinalis, now Hypomecis punctinalis
- 540. Phalaena lineata, now Siona lineata
- 542. Phalaena exanthemata, now Cabera exanthemata
- 545. Phalaena ornata, now Scopula ornata
- 546. Phalaena sylvata, now Abraxas sylvata
- 549. Phalaena glaucata, now Cilix glaucata
- 551. Phalaena chlorosata, now Petrophora chlorosata
- 561. Phalaena moeniata, now Scotopteryx moeniata
- 565. Phalaena aurata, now Pyrausta aurata
- 567. Phalaena ochrata, now Idaea ochrata
- 571. Phalaena alpinata, now Glacies alpinata
- 572. Phalaena murinata, now Minoa murinata
- 575. Phalaena laevigata, now Idaea laevigata
- 576. Phalaena inquinata, now Idaea inquinata
- 577. Phalaena tenebrata, now Panemeria tenebrata
- 579. Phalaena despicata, now Pyrausta despicata
- 580. Phalaena nigrata, now Pyrausta nigrata
- 583. Phalaena podana, now Archips podana
- 591. Phalaena rufana, now Celypha rufana
- 595. Phalaena montana, now Macrophya montana
- 599. Phalaena formosana, now Enarmonia formosana
- 600. Phalaena rivulana, now Celypha rivulana
- 607. Phalaena anthracinalis, now Euplocamus anthracinalis
- 609. Phalaena citrinalis, now Hypercallia citrinalis
- 610. Phalaena trabealis, now Emmelia trabealis
- 612. Phalaena lunalis, now Zanclognatha lunalis
- 614. Phalaena extimalis, now Evergestis extimalis
- 615. Phalaena sericealis, now Rivula sericealis
- 616. Phalaena ruralis, now Pleuroptya ruralis
- 618. Phalaena nemoralis, now Agrotera nemoralis
- 620. Phalaena perlella, now Crambus perlella
- 627. Phalaena craterella, now Chrysocrambus craterellus
- 628. Phalaena chrysonuchella, now Thisanotia chrysonuchella
- 636. Phalaena palliatella, now Eilema palliatella
- 638. Phalaena forficella, now Harpella forficella
- 643. Phalaena mucronella, now Ypsolopha mucronella
- 649. Phalaena rufimitrella, now Cauchas rufimitrella
- 654. Phalaena scalella, now Pseudotelphusa scalella
- 660. Phalaena aruncella, now Micropterix aruncella
- 661. Phalaena alchimiella, now Caloptilia alchimiella
- 662. Phalaena aureatella, now Micropterix aureatella
- 673. Phalaena bipunctidactyla, now Stenoptilia bipunctidactyla
- 734. Tenthredo ribesii, now Nematus ribesii
- 819. Apis pascuorum, now Bombus pascuorum
- 833. Formica vaga, now Camponotus vagus
- 870. Musca maculata, now Graphomya maculata
- 876. Musca tuguriorum, now Phaonia tuguriorum
- 880. Musca angelicae, now Phaonia angelicae
- 954. Conops pertinax, now Eristalis pertinax
- 962. Conops cuprea, now Ferdinandea cuprea
- 967. Conops aeneus, now Eristalinus aeneus
- 1134. Oniscus muscorum, now Philoscia muscorum

== Publication ==
Entomologia Carniolica was published by Johann Thomas von Trattner in Vienna in 1763. Forty-three plates of illustrations were prepared for publication, but were never offered for sale, and few copies of Entomologia Carniolica include the plates. They illustrate the species numbered 1–815, with the exception of the genus Aphis (species 396–410).

Entomologia Carniolica was published long before the international standardisation of units; to help readers understand his measurements, Scopoli therefore included a printed scale of three Parisian inches, each divided into twelve lines. His inch was approximately 26.5 millimetres (1.04 in) long, making each line approximately 2.2 mm (0.087 in).
