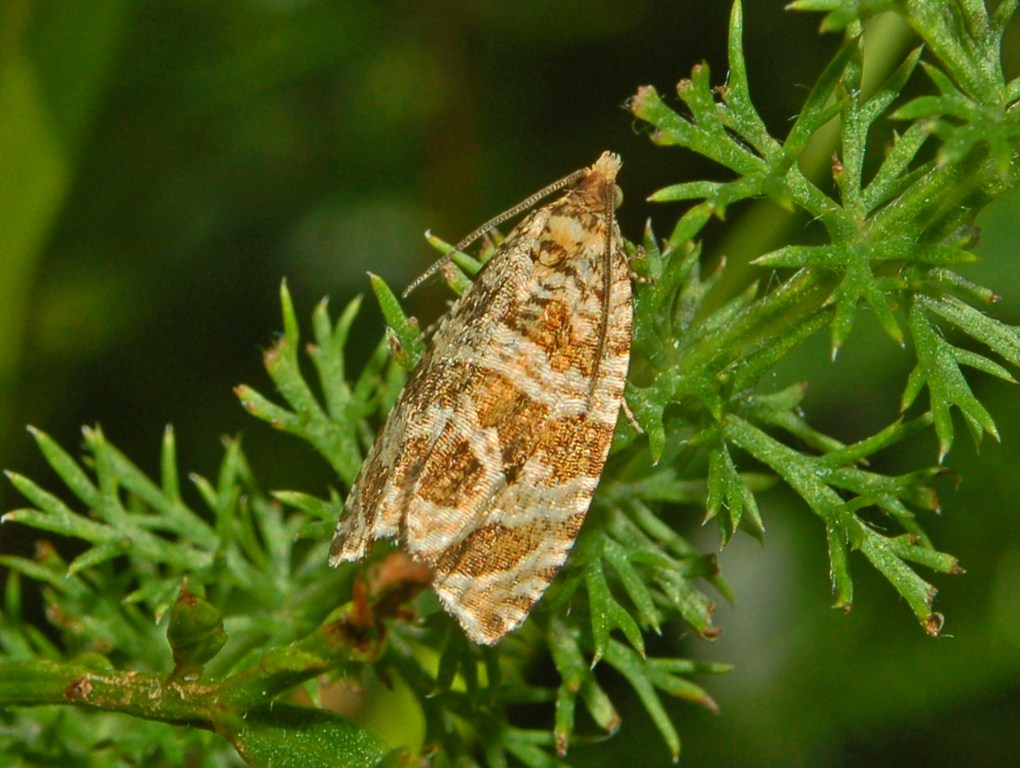

Scientific classification
- Kingdom: Animalia
- Phylum: Arthropoda
- Clade: Pancrustacea
- Class: Insecta
- Order: Lepidoptera
- Family: Tortricidae
- Genus: Celypha
- Species: C. rivulana

Binomial name
- Celypha rivulana (Scopoli, 1763)

Synonyms
- Phalaena rivulana Scopoli, 1763; Olethreutes rivulanus (Scopoli, 1763)

= Celypha rivulana =

Species of moth

Celypha rivulana is a small moth species of the family Tortricidae. It is found in most of Europe.

The wingspan is 16–18 mm. The forewing termen is faintly sinuate. The ground colour is whitish, striated with brown and grey. A sinuate fascia limits the basal patch. The central fascia has a posterior indented prominence in the middle. There is a subtriangular praetornal spot, a straight subapical fascia, and a triangular apical spot trifurcate on costa all ferruginous - brown more or less sprinkled with black. The hindwings are light grey. The larva dull yellow-green; head and plate of 2 black. Julius von Kennel provides a full description.

The adult moths fly in June, July and August.

The larvae are polyphagous, feeding on a variety of herbaceous plants, including Genista tinctoria, Hieracium, Lotus and Plantago.
