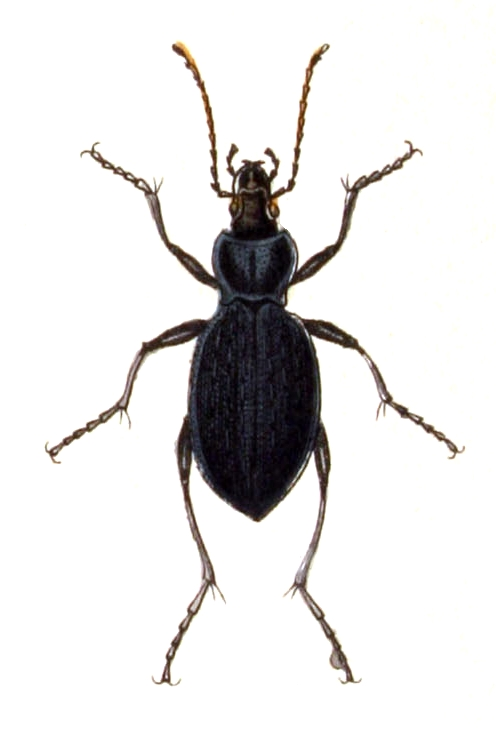

Scientific classification
- Domain: Eukaryota
- Kingdom: Animalia
- Phylum: Arthropoda
- Class: Insecta
- Order: Coleoptera
- Suborder: Adephaga
- Family: Carabidae
- Genus: Carabus
- Species: C. catenulatus

Binomial name
- Carabus catenulatus (Scopoli, 1763)

= Carabus catenulatus =

Species of beetle

Carabus catenulatus is a species of beetle endemic to Europe, where it is observed in Bosnia and Herzegovina, mainland Italy, Croatia, Slovenia, and Switzerland.
