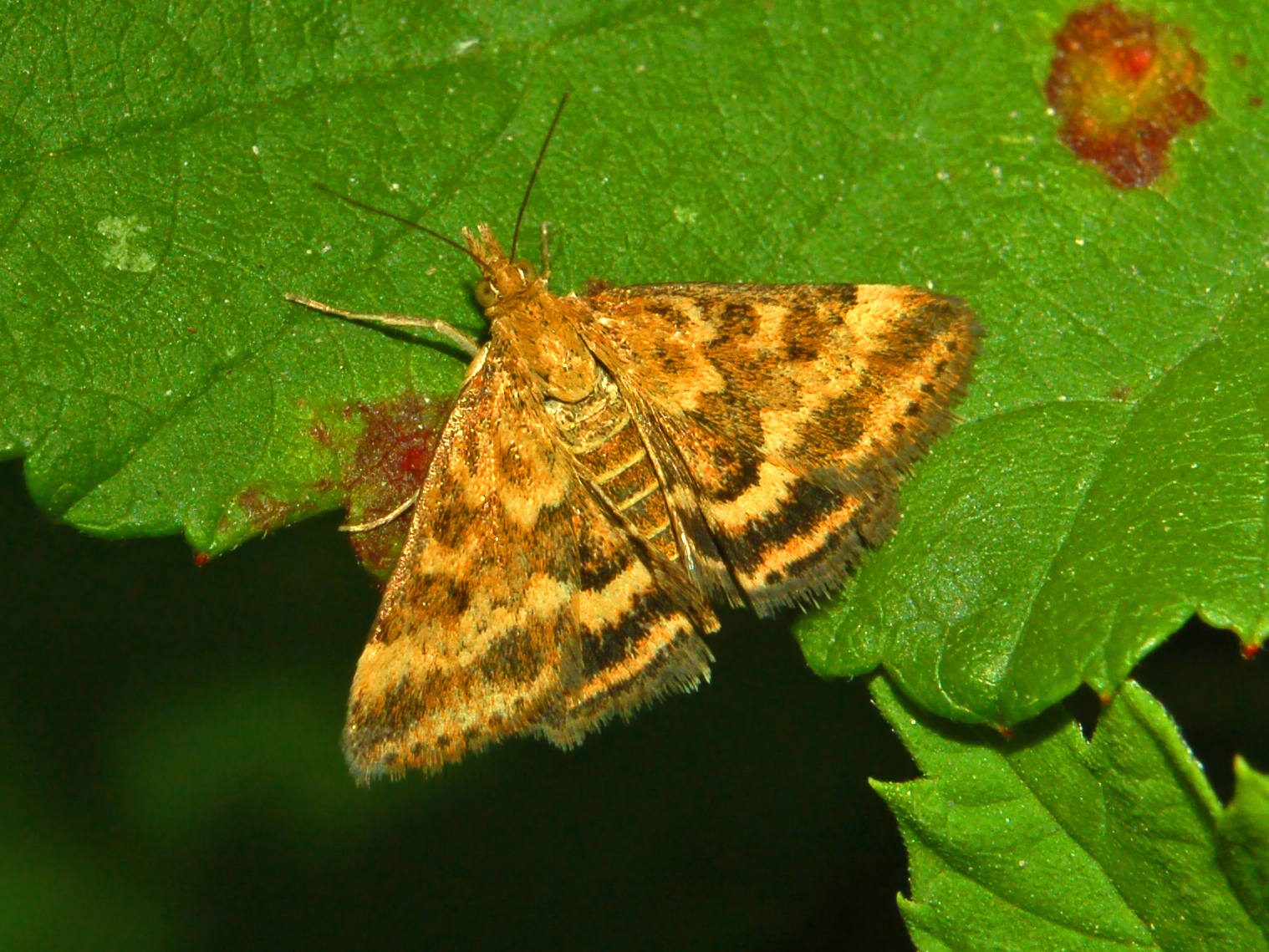

Scientific classification
- Domain: Eukaryota
- Kingdom: Animalia
- Phylum: Arthropoda
- Class: Insecta
- Order: Lepidoptera
- Family: Crambidae
- Genus: Pyrausta
- Species: P. despicata

Binomial name
- Pyrausta despicata (Scopoli, 1763)

Synonyms
- Phalaena despicata Scopoli, 1763; Herbula picarialis Walker, 1866; Pyrausta despicata ifranalis Leraut, 2001; Phalaena Tortrix koenigiana O. F. Müller, 1764; Pyralis cespitalis Denis & Schiffermüller, 1775; Pyralis coespitalis A. Costa, 1843; Pirausta intermedialis Duponchel, 1833; Pyrausta cespitalis ab. hafneri Rebel, 1916; Pyrausta Pyralis cespitalis yangtsealis Caradja, 1938; Pyralis sordialis Thunberg, 1784; Pyralis sordidalis Hübner, 1796; Pyrausta cespitalis ab. extincta Skala, 1928; Pyrausta despicata f. hispanalis Dufrane, 1957; Pyrausta tendinosalis Bremer, 1864; Pyrausta vestianella Clerck, 1764; Pyrausta zonana Panzer, 1804

= Pyrausta despicata =

Species of moth

Pyrausta despicata, the straw-barred pearl, is a species of moth of the family Crambidae. It was described by Giovanni Antonio Scopoli in his 1763 Entomologia Carniolica.

== Description ==
The wingspan of Pyrausta despicata can reach 14–19 mm. The wings are brown or greyish, with quite variable pale brown markings. The forewings are brownish grey or brown, sometimes blackish-sprinkled; first line obscurely pale or obsolete; second in pale greyish-ochreous, often obsolete except on costa, in male whitish-ochreous, dilated on costa; small orbicular and oval discal spot rather darker, in female sometimes separated by a pale spot; sometimes a pale subterminal streak. Hindwings in male grey in female blackish; sometimes a darker discal dot; a curved postmedian fascia and subterminal streak in male obscurely ochreous-whitish, in female whitish-ochreous. The larva is dull brownish-black; dorsal line double, grey; spiracular dull ochreous; spots black, grey circled; head and plate of 2 brown, darker-freckled

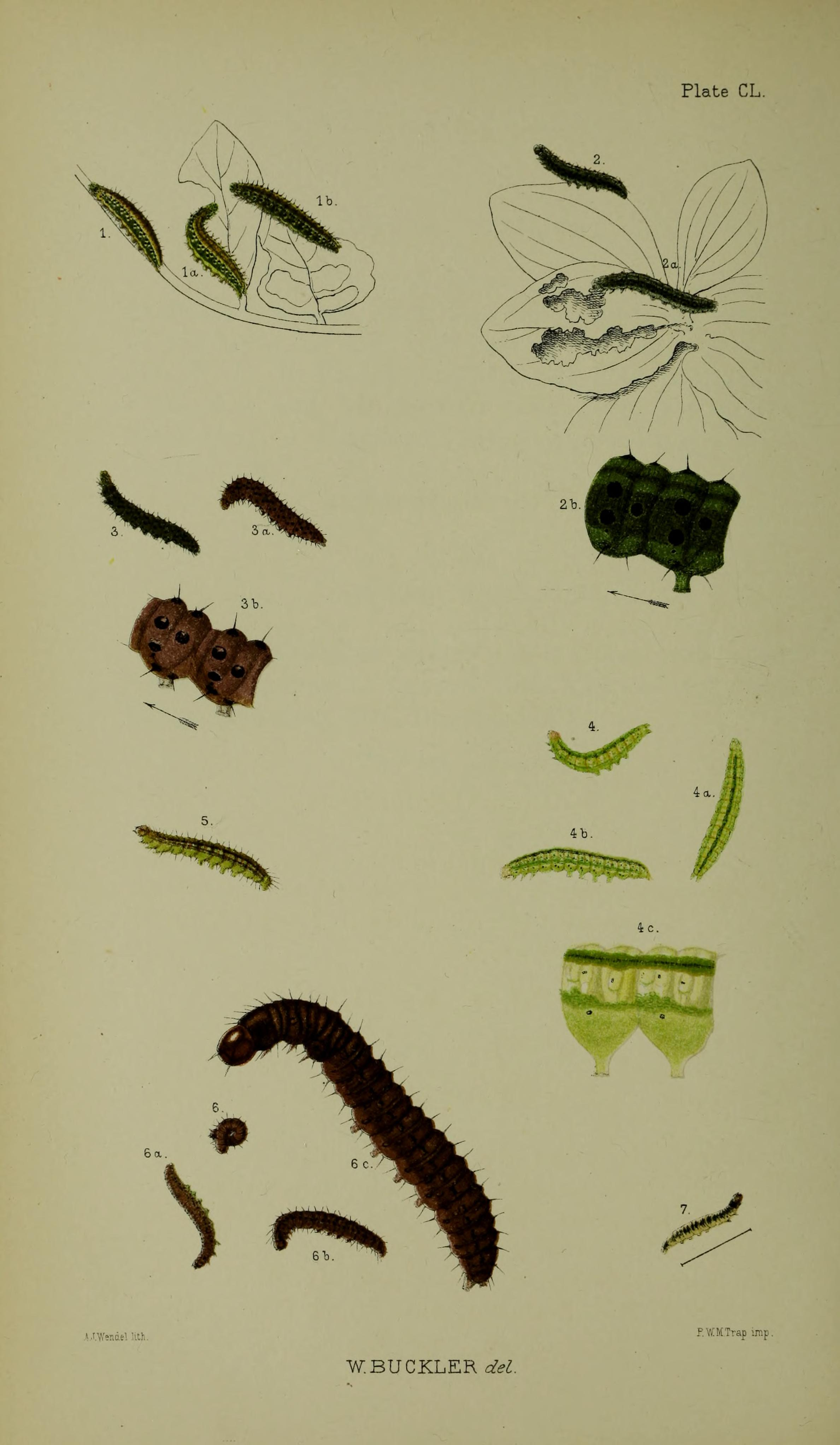
Figs. 2, 2a larvae in various stages of growth 2b enlargement of two segments

The moth flies from May to September depending on the location, in two generations. It is active in the sunshine and at dusk. The larvae feed on Plantago lanceolata and Plantago major.

== Distribution ==
Pyrausta despicata is present in most of Europe.

== Habitat ==
This moth prefers chalky and limestone habitats.
