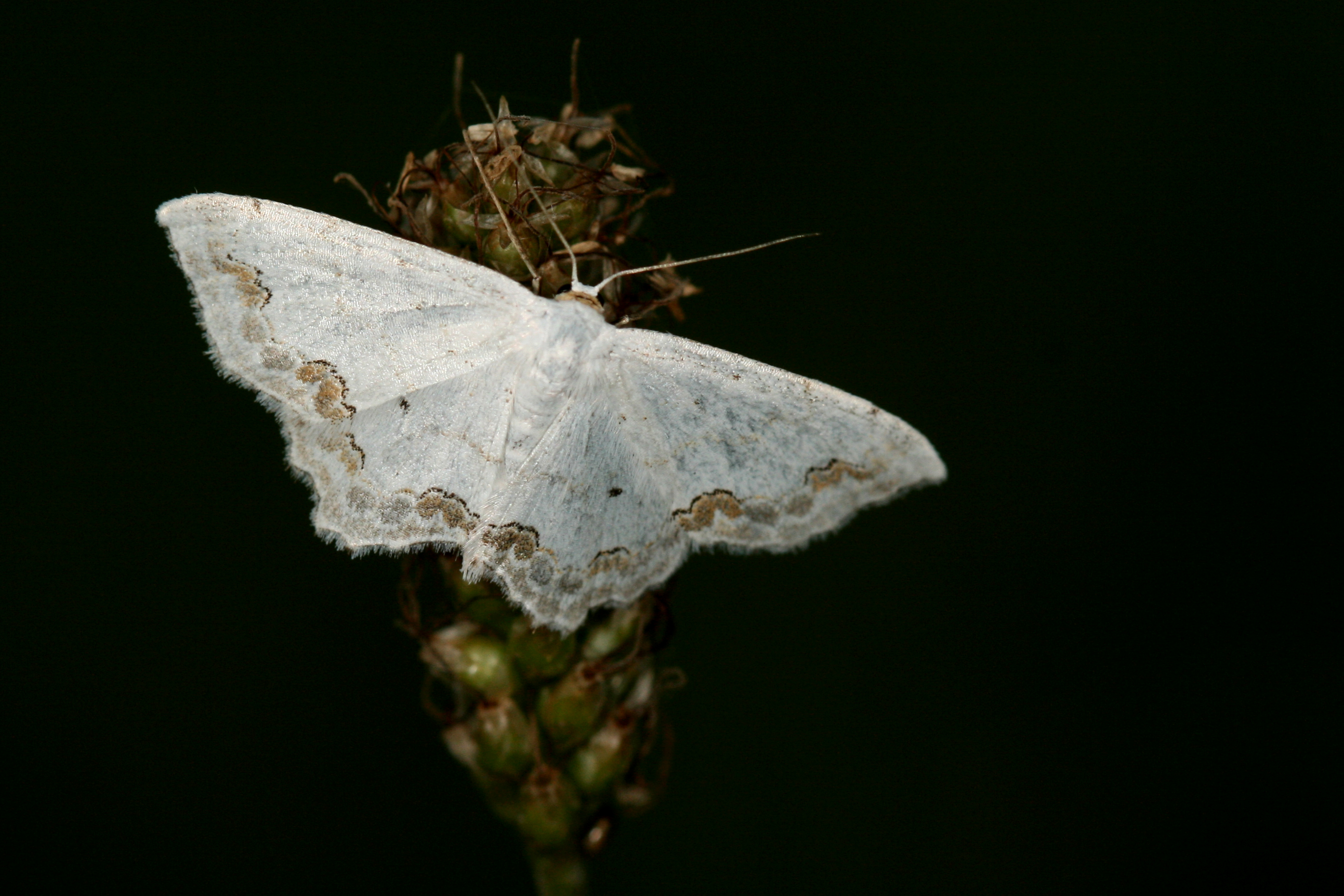

Scientific classification
- Domain: Eukaryota
- Kingdom: Animalia
- Phylum: Arthropoda
- Class: Insecta
- Order: Lepidoptera
- Family: Geometridae
- Genus: Scopula
- Species: S. ornata

Binomial name
- Scopula ornata (Scopoli, 1763)

Synonyms
- Phalaena ornata Scopoli, 1763; Geometra ornataria Hübner, [1799]; Phalaena paludata Linnaeus, 1767; Geometra arcuaria Hubner, 1799; Scopula arcuaria; Sphecodes arcuaria; Phalaena instilata Hufnagel, 1767; Phalaena institata Rottemburg, 1777; Phalaena interrupta Goeze, 1781; Phalaena intersecta Fourcroy, 1785; Phalaena paludalis Schrank, 1802; Scopula cinis Inoue, 1946

= Scopula ornata =

Species of geometer moth in subfamily Sterrhinae

Scopula ornata, the lace border, is a moth of the family Geometridae. The species was first described by Giovanni Antonio Scopoli in his 1763 Entomologia Carniolica. It is found in Europe, North Africa and the Near East.

The wingspan is 21–24 millimetres (0.83–0.94 in). Adults are on wing in May and June, then again from late July to September.

The larvae feed on various herbaceous plants, mainly Thymus, but also Achillea, Mentha, Origanum, Rumex, Taraxacum and Veronica.

== Subspecies ==
- Scopula ornata ornata
- Scopula ornata enzela Prout, 1935
- Scopula ornata Scopula subornata Prout, 1913
