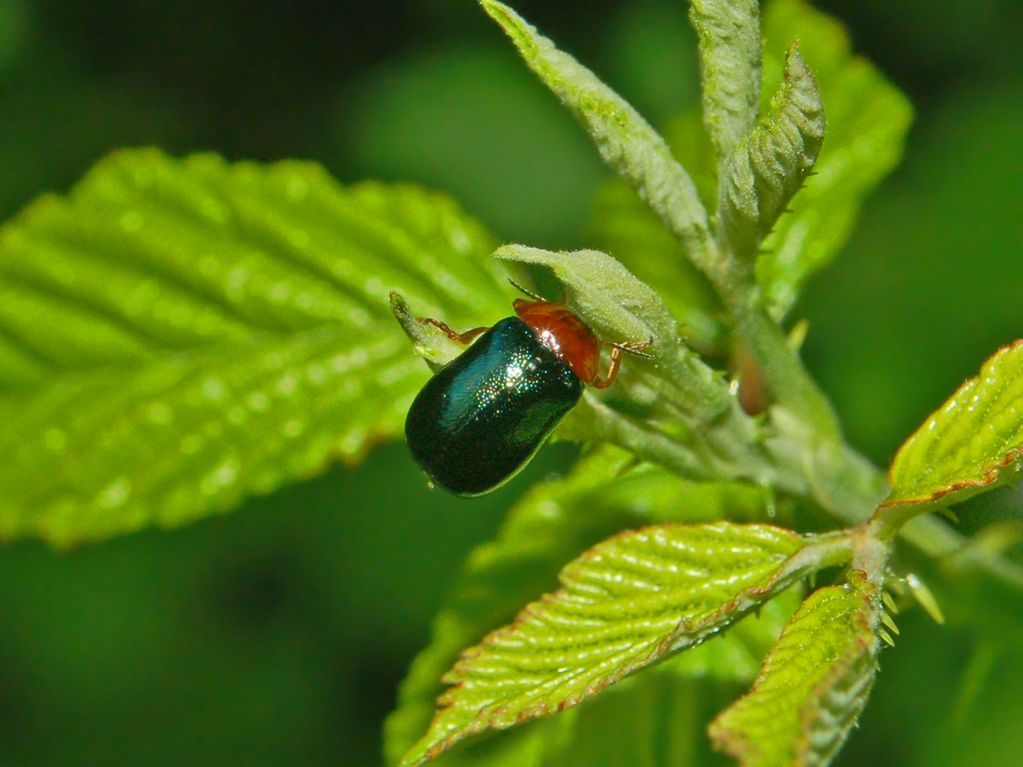
- Adult of Smaragdina salicina

Scientific classification
- Kingdom: Animalia
- Phylum: Arthropoda
- Clade: Pancrustacea
- Class: Insecta
- Order: Coleoptera
- Suborder: Polyphaga
- Infraorder: Cucujiformia
- Family: Chrysomelidae
- Subfamily: Cryptocephalinae
- Tribe: Clytrini
- Genus: Smaragdina; Chevrolat, 1836

Synonyms
- Calyptorhina Lacordaire, 1848; Carmentis Gistel, 1848; Cyaniris Chevrolat, 1836 nec Dalman, 1816; Gynandropthalma Lacordaire, 1848; Medvedevella Özdikmen, 2008; Monrosia Medvedev, 1971; Necyomantes Gistel, 1848; Smaragdinella Medvedev, 1971 nec Adams & Reeve, 1848

= Smaragdina =

Genus of beetles

Smaragdina is a genus of short-horned leaf beetles belonging to the family Chrysomelidae, subfamily Cryptocephalinae.

== Species ==
These species belong to the genus Smaragdina:

- Smaragdina aeneoviridis Lopatin, 1975
- Smaragdina aethiops Lopatin, 2004
- Smaragdina affinis (Illiger, 1794)
- Smaragdina algirica (Weise, 1894)
- Smaragdina amasina (Pic, 1897)
- Smaragdina apiciflava (Chûjô, 1952)
- Smaragdina apicipennis (Jacoby, 1908)
- Smaragdina apicitarsis (Fairmaire, 1876)
- Smaragdina assamensis (Jacoby, 1908)
- Smaragdina atriceps (Pic, 1927)
- Smaragdina atricollis (Pic, 1922)
- Smaragdina atrocincta (Pic, 1932)
- Smaragdina atropyga (Pic, 1941)
- Smaragdina aurita (Linnaeus, 1767)
- Smaragdina bechynei (Cobos, 1956)
- Smaragdina bertiae Medvedev, 1992
- Smaragdina bezdeki Medvedev, 2010
- Smaragdina bicoloriceps (Pic, 1929)
- Smaragdina biornata Lefèvre, 1872
- Smaragdina bisbipunctata Medvedev, 2010
- Smaragdina bohemani (Jacoby, 1908)
- Smaragdina boreosinica Gressitt & Kimoto, 1961
- Smaragdina bothrionota Tan, 1987
- Smaragdina centromaculata Medvedev, 1995
- Smaragdina chloris (Lacordaire, 1848)
- Smaragdina chrysomeloides (Lacordaire, 1848)
- Smaragdina clavareaui (Jacobson, 1906)
- Smaragdina clypealis (Medvedev, 1992)
- Smaragdina cobosi (Codina, 1963)
- Smaragdina cochinchinensis (Lefèvre, 1889)
- Smaragdina coerulea (Jacoby, 1892)
- Smaragdina collaris (Fabricius, 1781)
- Smaragdina compressipennis (Pic, 1927)
- Smaragdina concolor (Fabricius, 1792)
- Smaragdina constrictifrons Medvedev, 2010
- Smaragdina coomani (Pic, 1928)
- Smaragdina cornuta (Jacoby, 1895)
- Smaragdina costata Tan & Wang, 1981
- Smaragdina crassipes (Duvivier, 1891)
- Smaragdina cribripennis Tan, 1988
- Smaragdina crucipennis (Jacoby, 1908)
- Smaragdina daklaka Medvedev, 2010
- Smaragdina dalatensis Kimoto & Gressitt, 1979
- Smaragdina delesserti (Lacordaire, 1848)
- Smaragdina discolor (Solsky, 1882)
- Smaragdina diversesignata (Pic, 1946)
- Smaragdina diversiceps (Pic, 1941)
- Smaragdina diversipes Letzner, 1839
- Smaragdina divisa (Jacoby, 1889)
- Smaragdina divisomima Medvedev, 2010
- Smaragdina djebellina (Lefèvre, 1872)
- Smaragdina dohertyi (Jacoby, 1908)
- Smaragdina duporti Pic, 1937)
- Smaragdina duvivieri (Jacoby, 1908)
- Smaragdina emarginata Medvedev, 1995
- Smaragdina eroshkinae Medvedev, 1988
- Smaragdina fabrei (Lefèvre, 1883)
- Smaragdina ferulae (Gené, 1839)
- Smaragdina flavicollis Charpentier, 1825
- Smaragdina flavicoxis Medvedev, 1992
- Smaragdina flavifrons Gressitt & Kimoto, 1961
- Smaragdina flavilabris (Breit, 1917)
- Smaragdina flaviventris (Jacoby, 1908)
- Smaragdina flavobasalis (Jacoby, 1908)
- Smaragdina flavovariegata Medvedev, 1999
- Smaragdina frontalis (Jacoby, 1908)
- Smaragdina fulveola (Jacoby, 1890)
- Smaragdina fulvitarsis Medvedev, 1992
- Smaragdina furthi Erber & Medvedev, 1999
- Smaragdina fuscicornis (Lacordaire, 1848)
- Smaragdina fuscitarsis (Jacoby, 1900)
- Smaragdina golda Jacobson, 1925
- Smaragdina graeca (Kraatz, 1872)
- Smaragdina gratiosa (Lucas, 1845)
- Smaragdina guillebeaui (Pic, 1927)
- Smaragdina hejingensis Duan, Wang & Zhou, 2022
- Smaragdina higuchii Kimoto & Takizawa, 1981
- Smaragdina himalayana Medvedev, 2010
- Smaragdina ihai (Chûjô, 1958)
- Smaragdina imitans (Jacoby, 1903)
- Smaragdina impressicollis Tan, 1992
- Smaragdina insulana Medvedev, 1992
- Smaragdina jeanvoinei (Pic, 1932)
- Smaragdina jordanica Medvedev, 2002
- Smaragdina judaica (Lefèvre, 1872)
- Smaragdina kejvali Kantner & Bezděk, 2007
- Smaragdina kimotoi Lopatin, 2003
- Smaragdina kimshona Medvedev, 1988
- Smaragdina kuromon Kimoto, 1984
- Smaragdina kurosuji Kimoto, 1984
- Smaragdina labilis Weise, 1889
- Smaragdina laboissierei (Pic, 1928)
- Smaragdina laevicollis (Jacoby, 1890)
- Smaragdina laevipennis (Jacoby, 1908)
- Smaragdina laosensis Kimoto & Gressitt, 1979
- Smaragdina latemedionotata (Pic, 1946)
- Smaragdina laticollis (Duvivier, 1892)
- Smaragdina levi Lopatin, 2004
- Smaragdina limbata (Steven, 1806)
- Smaragdina limbifera (Escalera, 1928)
- Smaragdina longicornis (Jacoby, 1897)
- Smaragdina macilenta (Weise, 1887)
- Smaragdina maculicollis (Chûjô, 1952)
- Smaragdina magnipunctata Duan, Wang and Zhou, 2022
- Smaragdina maharashtra Kantner & Bezděk, 2007
- Smaragdina malakkana Medvedev, 2010
- Smaragdina mandzhura (Jacobson, 1925)
- Smaragdina mangkamensis Tan & Wang, 1981
- Smaragdina mapellii Takizawa, 1990
- Smaragdina medvedevi Medvedev, 1984
- Smaragdina megalayana Medvedev & Kantner, 2002
- Smaragdina micheli Medvedev, 1995
- Smaragdina militaris (J. L. LeConte, 1858)
- Smaragdina minuta (Jacoby, 1908)
- Smaragdina minutissima (Lopatin, 1967)
- Smaragdina miyakei Kimoto, 1976
- Smaragdina miyatakei Kimoto, 1976
- Smaragdina montana Medvedev, 1988
- Smaragdina motschulskyi Medvedev, 1992
- Smaragdina moutoni (Pic, 1897)
- Smaragdina murzini Lopatin, 2003
- Smaragdina nagaensis (Jacoby, 1908)
- Smaragdina nigricollis Medvedev, 2004
- Smaragdina nigripennis (Chûjô, 1952)
- Smaragdina nigriscutis Medvedev, 1970
- Smaragdina nigroguttata Lopatin, 2002
- Smaragdina nigropygidialis (Pic, 1946)
- Smaragdina nigrosignata Pic, 1954
- Smaragdina nigrosternum Erber & Medvedev, 1999
- Smaragdina nigrosuturalis (Jacoby, 1908)
- Smaragdina nigrotibialis (Jacoby, 1908)
- Smaragdina nigroviolacea Lopatin, 2004
- Smaragdina nilgiriensis (Jacoby, 1903)
- Smaragdina nipponensis (Chûjô, 1951)
- Smaragdina nomurai Kimoto, 1976
- Smaragdina oblonga Lopatin, 2009
- Smaragdina obscuripes Weise, 1887
- Smaragdina octomaculata (Chûjô, 1952)
- Smaragdina oculata Medvedev, 1988
- Smaragdina occidentalis Medvedev, 2010
- Smaragdina orientalis (Jacoby, 1908)
- Smaragdina ornatipennis Medvedev, 2004
- Smaragdina pacholatkoi Medvedev, 2003
- Smaragdina pakistanica Medvedev, 2010
- Smaragdina pallescens (Pic, 1895)
- Smaragdina peplopteroides (Weise, 1889)
- Smaragdina persica (Pic, 1911)
- Smaragdina piceifrons (Pic, 1941)
- Smaragdina planifrons (Jacoby, 1908)
- Smaragdina potanini Medvedev, 1970
- Smaragdina punctatissima (Weise, 1892)
- Smaragdina quadrimaculata Lopatin, 2009
- Smaragdina quadratomaculata (Jacoby, 1896)
- Smaragdina rapillyi (Lopatin, 2002)
- Smaragdina reductelineata (Pic, 1946)
- Smaragdina regalini Medvedev & Kantner, 2002
- Smaragdina regularis Medvedev, 1985
- Smaragdina reyi (Brisout, 1866)
- Smaragdina rufimana Lacordaire, 1848
- Smaragdina salemensis (Pic, 1946)
- Smaragdina salicina (Scopoli, 1763)
- Smaragdina sassii Warchałowski, 2012
- Smaragdina saudica Medvedev, 1993
- Smaragdina scalaris (Pic, 1927)
- Smaragdina schereri Lopatin, 2006
- Smaragdina scutellaris (Lefèvre, 1872)
- Smaragdina semiauranthiaca (Fairmaire, 1888)
- Smaragdina semipunctata (Duvivier, 1891)
- Smaragdina semiviridis (Pic, 1922)
- Smaragdina signaticollis (Redtenbacher, 1848)
- Smaragdina sikkimia (Jacoby, 1903)
- Smaragdina spenceri Kimoto & Gressitt, 1979
- Smaragdina sprecherae Medvedev, 2002
- Smaragdina stenroosi (Jacobson, 1901)
- Smaragdina striatipennis (Jacoby, 1903)
- Smaragdina subacuminata (Pic, 1927)
- Smaragdina subdivisa (Jacoby, 1900)
- Smaragdina subsignata (Fairmaire, 1888)
- Smaragdina symmetria Tan, 1988
- Smaragdina szechuana Medvedev, 1995
- Smaragdina tamdaoana Medvedev, 2010
- Smaragdina tani Lopatin, 2004
- Smaragdina taynguensis Medvedev, 1985
- Smaragdina terminalis (Lefèvre, 1883)
- Smaragdina thailandica Medvedev, 2010
- Smaragdina thorasica (Fischer, 1842)
- Smaragdina tianmuensis Wang & Zhou, 2013
- Smaragdina tibialis (Brullé, 1832)
- Smaragdina tonkinensis (Lefèvre, 1891)
- Smaragdina trimaculaticeps (Pic, 1946)
- Smaragdina tunisea Warchałowski, 2000
- Smaragdina unipunctata (Olivier, 1808)
- Smaragdina variabilis (Chûjô, 1952)
- Smaragdina vaulogeri (Pic, 1894)
- Smaragdina vietnamensis Kimoto & Gressitt, 1979
- Smaragdina vinula (Weise, 1903)
- Smaragdina virgata Lopatin, 2004
- Smaragdina viridana (Lacordaire, 1848)
- Smaragdina viridis (Kraatz, 1882)
- Smaragdina viridipennis (Pic, 1937)
- Smaragdina volkovitshi Lopatin, 2004
- Smaragdina wallardiensis (Jacoby, 1908)
- Smaragdina wittmeri (Medvedev, 1970)
- Smaragdina xanthaspis (Germar, 1824)
- Smaragdina yajiangensis Wang & Zhou, 2013
- Smaragdina yangae Wang & Zhou, 2013
- Smaragdina yunnana Medvedev, 1995
- Smaragdina zhangi Wang & Zhou, 2013
