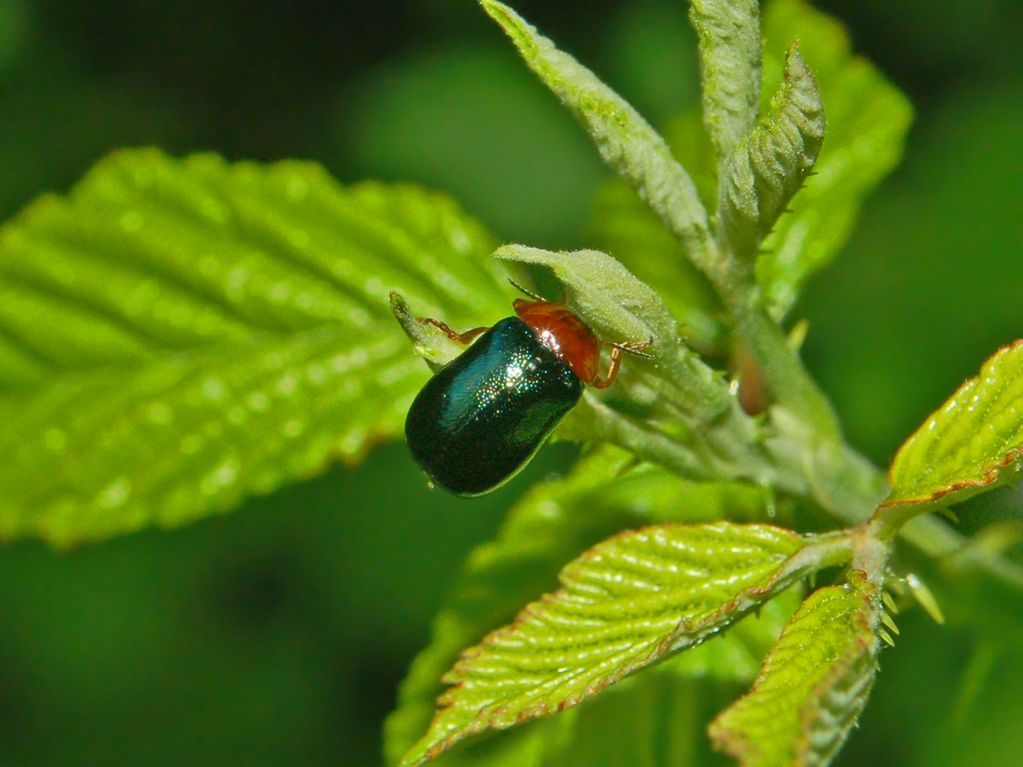

Scientific classification
- Kingdom: Animalia
- Phylum: Arthropoda
- Clade: Pancrustacea
- Class: Insecta
- Order: Coleoptera
- Suborder: Polyphaga
- Infraorder: Cucujiformia
- Family: Chrysomelidae
- Subfamily: Cryptocephalinae
- Tribe: Clytrini
- Genus: Smaragdina
- Species: S. salicina

Binomial name
- Smaragdina salicina (Scopoli, 1763)

Synonyms
- Smaragdina cyanea (Fabricius, 1775)

= Smaragdina salicina =

Species of beetle

Smaragdina salicina is a species of short-horned leaf beetles belonging to the family Chrysomelidae, subfamily Cryptocephalinae.

This leaf beetle lives in Europe, in the eastern Palearctic realm, and in the Near East.

The adults are 4.5–6.5 millimetres (0.18–0.26 in) long. The colours of head and elytra of this beetle are dark blue, while pronotum is reddish and legs are yellowish.

They mainly feed on Salix and Crataegus species, but also on leaves of various other plants (Blackthorn Prunus spinosa, Trifolium species, etc.).

At the time of egg-laying they wrap their eggs in an envelope of their own excrement and drop them on the ground from above, manoeuvring with their hind legs.
