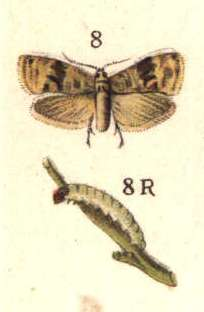

Scientific classification
- Kingdom: Animalia
- Phylum: Arthropoda
- Clade: Pancrustacea
- Class: Insecta
- Order: Lepidoptera
- Family: Tortricidae
- Genus: Eupoecilia
- Species: E. ambiguella

Binomial name
- Eupoecilia ambiguella (Hübner, 1796)

Synonyms
- Tinea ambiguella Hübner, [1796]; Tinea omphaciella Faure-Biguet & Sionest, 1801; Tinea uvae Nenning, 1811; Alucita uvella Vallot, 1822; Tortrix roserana Frolich, 1828; ?Tinea abigua Haworth, 1828; Lobesia omphiaciana Bruand, 1837; Tinea staphislites Vallot, 1838; Clysia turbinaris Meyrick, 1928

= Eupoecilia ambiguella =

Species of moth

Eupoecilia ambiguella, the vine moth or European grape berry moth, (Note: names shared with Lobesia botrana) is a Palearctic moth species of the family Tortricidae. It was first described in 1796 (as Tinea ambiguella) by Jacob Hübner. It is an economically significant grape pest species.

== Description ==
Most sources state the wingspan as 12–15 mm, although Zhang and Houhun instead give it as 9–15 mm.

== Distribution ==
The distribution range of Eupoecilia ambiguella stretches from the United Kingdom to Japan, occurring north up into Fennoscandia and south to the Mediterranean Basin. Its range overlaps in part with that of Lobesia botrana, but E. ambiguella prefers colder, more humid environments than L. botrana, and in shared areas may be found at a higher altitude or co-occurring in the same vineyard.

== Host plants ==
The larvae are polyphagous, with more than thirty known host plants including dogwood, smooth bedstraw, blackthorn, Virginia creeper, grape and honeysuckle. According to some sources, its original host plant is common mugworth (Artemisia vulgaris), but according to Ioriatti, Lucchi and Varela, "grapevine is now accepted as its original host."

=== Economic impact ===
Eupoecilia ambiguella is a vineyard pest, and until the 1920s was the chief such pest in European vineyards. Although it has since then largely been replaced by Lobesia botrana in the southern European part of its range, it remains a major pest in Northern European and South-German wineproducing regions.

== Behaviour ==
Eupoecilia ambiguella generally occurs in two generations, but up to three in the southern parts of its range. Larvae of the initial generation are flower-feeders, while those of following generations feed on berries. Adults are most active from dusk to early morning.
