= Eupoecilia dactylota =

Scientific classification
- Domain: Eukaryota
- Kingdom: Animalia
- Phylum: Arthropoda
- Class: Insecta
- Order: Lepidoptera
- Family: Tortricidae
- Genus: Eupoecilia
- Species: E. dactylota

Binomial name
- Eupoecilia dactylota (Diakonoff, 1952)

Synonyms
- Arachniotes dactylota Diakonoff, 1952

Species of moth

Eupoecilia dactylota is a species of moth of the family Tortricidae. It was described by Alexey Diakonoff in 1952, and can be found on New Guinea.
