= Eupoecilia tenggerensis =

Scientific classification
- Domain: Eukaryota
- Kingdom: Animalia
- Phylum: Arthropoda
- Class: Insecta
- Order: Lepidoptera
- Family: Tortricidae
- Genus: Eupoecilia
- Species: E. tenggerensis

Binomial name
- Eupoecilia tenggerensis (Diakonoff, 1949)

Synonyms
- Clysiana tenggerensis Diakonoff, 1949

Species of moth

Eupoecilia tenggerensis is a species of moth of the family Tortricidae. It is found on Java in Indonesia.
