= Eupoecilia amphimnesta =

Scientific classification
- Kingdom: Animalia
- Phylum: Arthropoda
- Class: Insecta
- Order: Lepidoptera
- Family: Tortricidae
- Genus: Eupoecilia
- Species: E. amphimnesta

Binomial name
- Eupoecilia amphimnesta (Meyrick, 1928)

Synonyms
- Euxanthis amphimnesta Meyrick, 1928; Agapeta amphimnesta

Species of moth

Eupoecilia amphimnesta is a species of moth of the family Tortricidae. It is found in China (Anhui, Beijing, Chongqing, Hainan, Hebei, Heilongjiang, Henan, Hubei, Hunan, Fujian, Gansu, Guangdong, Guangxi, Guizhou, Jiangxi, Liaoning, Ningxia, Shaanxi, Shanxi, Sichuan, Tianjin, Xinjiang, Yunnan, Zhejiang), Taiwan, India, Japan, Korea, Mongolia, Russia and Europe.
