= Eupoecilia sumbana =

Scientific classification
- Domain: Eukaryota
- Kingdom: Animalia
- Phylum: Arthropoda
- Class: Insecta
- Order: Lepidoptera
- Family: Tortricidae
- Genus: Eupoecilia
- Species: E. sumbana

Binomial name
- Eupoecilia sumbana (Diakonoff, 1953)

Synonyms
- Clysia sumbana Diakonoff, 1953

Species of moth

Eupoecilia sumbana is a species of moth of the family Tortricidae. It is found on Sumba in Indonesia.
