= Eupoecilia citrinana =

Scientific classification
- Kingdom: Animalia
- Phylum: Arthropoda
- Clade: Pancrustacea
- Class: Insecta
- Order: Lepidoptera
- Family: Tortricidae
- Genus: Eupoecilia
- Species: E. citrinana

Binomial name
- Eupoecilia citrinana Razowski, 1960

Synonyms
- Euxanthis patriciana Caradja, 1916

Species of moth

Eupoecilia citrinana is a species of moth of the family Tortricidae. It is found in China (Beijing, Hebei, Heilongjiang, Henan, Hunan, Jilin, Shaanxi, Tianjin), Japan, Korea and Russia.

The wingspan is 13–17 mm.
