= Eupoecilia dentana =

Scientific classification
- Kingdom: Animalia
- Phylum: Arthropoda
- Class: Insecta
- Order: Lepidoptera
- Family: Tortricidae
- Genus: Eupoecilia
- Species: E. dentana

Binomial name
- Eupoecilia dentana Razowski, 1968

Species of moth

Eupoecilia dentana is a species of moth of the family Tortricidae. It is found on Sumatra in Indonesia.
