= Eupoecilia anisoneura =

Scientific classification
- Domain: Eukaryota
- Kingdom: Animalia
- Phylum: Arthropoda
- Class: Insecta
- Order: Lepidoptera
- Family: Tortricidae
- Genus: Eupoecilia
- Species: E. anisoneura

Binomial name
- Eupoecilia anisoneura Diakonoff, 1982

Species of moth

Eupoecilia anisoneura is a species of moth of the family Tortricidae first described by Alexey Diakonoff in 1982. It is found in Sri Lanka.

== Description ==
The wingspan of the female is 6 mm. Head whitish. Antenna and palpus pale ochreous. Thorax pale ochreous. Abdomen whitish. Forewings sub-lanceolate with a straight costa. Apex pointed and termen faintly sinuate. Forewings whitish ochreous, towards costa becoming bright ochreous. A dark brown-fuscous streak found at the base of costa. Central fascia blackish fuscous. Anterior edge is concave and well defined with irregular posterior. Beyond fascia, there are indistinct dark fuscous scattered points towards termen. Hindwings pellucent and white. Cilia whitish hyaline. A subbasal moderate band visible.
