= Eupoecilia yubariana =

Scientific classification
- Kingdom: Animalia
- Phylum: Arthropoda
- Class: Insecta
- Order: Lepidoptera
- Family: Tortricidae
- Genus: Eupoecilia
- Species: E. yubariana

Binomial name
- Eupoecilia yubariana Razowski, 2005

Species of moth

Eupoecilia yubariana is a species of moth of the family Tortricidae. It is found in Japan on the island of Hokkaido.
