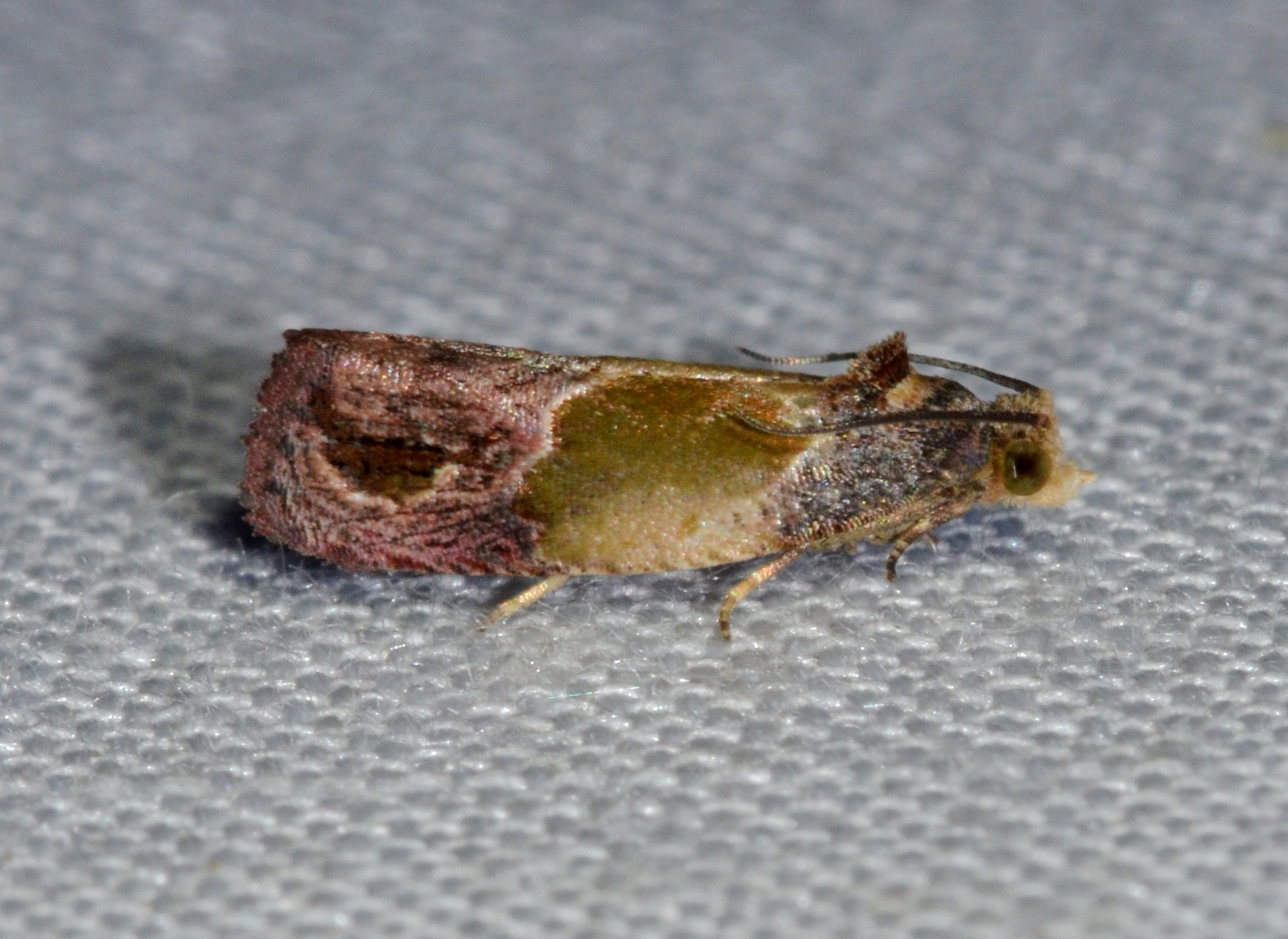
- Eumarozia malachitana

Scientific classification
- Domain: Eukaryota
- Kingdom: Animalia
- Phylum: Arthropoda
- Class: Insecta
- Order: Lepidoptera
- Family: Tortricidae
- Tribe: Olethreutini
- Genus: Eumarozia; Heinrich, 1926

= Eumarozia =

Genus of tortrix moths

Eumarozia is a genus of moths belonging to the subfamily Olethreutinae of the family Tortricidae.

== Species ==
- Eumarozia beckeri Clarke, 1973
- Eumarozia elaeanthes (Meyrick, 1927)
- Eumarozia malachitana (Zeller, 1875)

== See also ==
- List of Tortricidae genera
