= Eupoecilia kruegeriana =

Scientific classification
- Kingdom: Animalia
- Phylum: Arthropoda
- Class: Insecta
- Order: Lepidoptera
- Family: Tortricidae
- Genus: Eupoecilia
- Species: E. kruegeriana

Binomial name
- Eupoecilia kruegeriana Razowski, 1993

Species of moth

Eupoecilia kruegeriana is a species of moth of the family Tortricidae. It is found in South Africa, Kenya, Tanzania and Uganda. The habitat consists of various shrub and forest areas, Acacia woodland and the edges of rain forests.

The wingspan is 11–12 mm for males and 14–15 mm for females.
