= Eupoecilia coniopa =

Scientific classification
- Kingdom: Animalia
- Phylum: Arthropoda
- Clade: Pancrustacea
- Class: Insecta
- Order: Lepidoptera
- Family: Tortricidae
- Genus: Eupoecilia
- Species: E. coniopa

Binomial name
- Eupoecilia coniopa Diakonoff, 1984

Species of moth

Eupoecilia coniopa is a species of moth of the family Tortricidae. It is found on Borneo.
