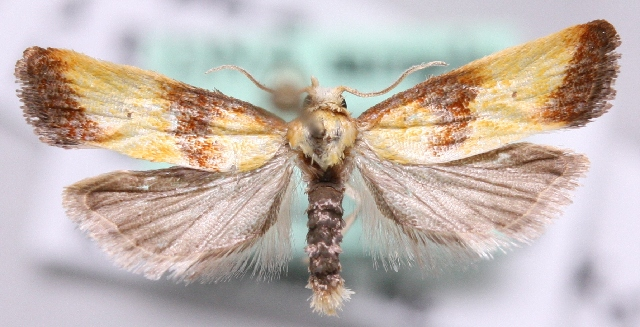
- Eupoecilia sanguisorbana

Scientific classification
- Domain: Eukaryota
- Kingdom: Animalia
- Phylum: Arthropoda
- Class: Insecta
- Order: Lepidoptera
- Family: Tortricidae
- Tribe: Cochylini
- Genus: Eupoecilia; Stephens, 1829

= Eupoecilia =

Genus of tortrix moths

Eupoecilia is a genus of moths belonging to the subfamily Tortricinae of the family Tortricidae. It was described by Stephens in 1829.

== Species ==
- Eupoecilia aburica Razowski, 1993
- Eupoecilia acrographa (Turner, 1916)
- Eupoecilia ambiguella (Hübner, [1796])
- Eupoecilia amphimnesta (Meyrick, 1928)
- Eupoecilia anebrica Diakonoff, 1983
- Eupoecilia angustana (Hübner, [1796-1799])
- Eupoecilia anisoneura Diakonoff, 1982
- Eupoecilia armifera Razowski, 1968
- Eupoecilia cebrana (Hübner, [1811-1813])
- Eupoecilia charixantha (Meyrick, 1928)
- Eupoecilia citrinana Razowski, 1960
- Eupoecilia coniopa Diakonoff, 1984
- Eupoecilia cracens Diakonoff, 1982
- Eupoecilia crocina Razowski, 1968
- Eupoecilia dactylota (Diakonoff, 1952)
- Eupoecilia dentana Razowski, 1968
- Eupoecilia diana Razowski, 1968
- Eupoecilia dynodesma (Diakonoff, 1971)
- Eupoecilia engelinae (Diakonoff, 1941)
- Eupoecilia eucalypta (Meyrick, 1928)
- Eupoecilia inouei Kawabe, 1972
- Eupoecilia kobeana Razowski, 1968
- Eupoecilia kruegeriana Razowski, 1993
- Eupoecilia lata Razowski, 1968
- Eupoecilia neurosema (Meyrick, 1938)
- Eupoecilia ochrotona Razowski, 1968
- Eupoecilia quinaspinalis X.Zhang & H.H.Li, 2008
- Eupoecilia reliquatrix (Meyrick, 1928)
- Eupoecilia sanguisorbana (Herrich-Schäffer, 1856)
- Eupoecilia scytalephora (Diakonoff, 1952)
- Eupoecilia sumatrana Diakonoff, 1983
- Eupoecilia sumbana (Diakonoff, 1953)
- Eupoecilia taneces (Diakonoff, 1973)
- Eupoecilia tenggerensis (Diakonoff, 1949)
- Eupoecilia thalia Diakonoff, 1984
- Eupoecilia wegneri (Diakonoff, 1941)
- Eupoecilia yubariana Razowski, 2005

== Synonyms ==
- Arachniotes Diakonoff, 1952 (type species: Arachniotes dactylota Diakonoff, 1952)
- Clysia Hübner, [1825] (type species: Tinea ambiguella Hübner, 1796 [preoccupied])
- Clysiana T. B. Fletcher, 1941 [replacement name for Clysia]
- Eupecilia Herrich-Schäffer, 1851 [misspelling of Eupoecilia]

== See also ==
- List of Tortricidae genera
