= Eupoecilia thalia =

Scientific classification
- Domain: Eukaryota
- Kingdom: Animalia
- Phylum: Arthropoda
- Class: Insecta
- Order: Lepidoptera
- Family: Tortricidae
- Genus: Eupoecilia
- Species: E. thalia

Binomial name
- Eupoecilia thalia Diakonoff, 1984

Species of moth

Eupoecilia thalia is a species of moth of the family Tortricidae. It is found on Borneo.
