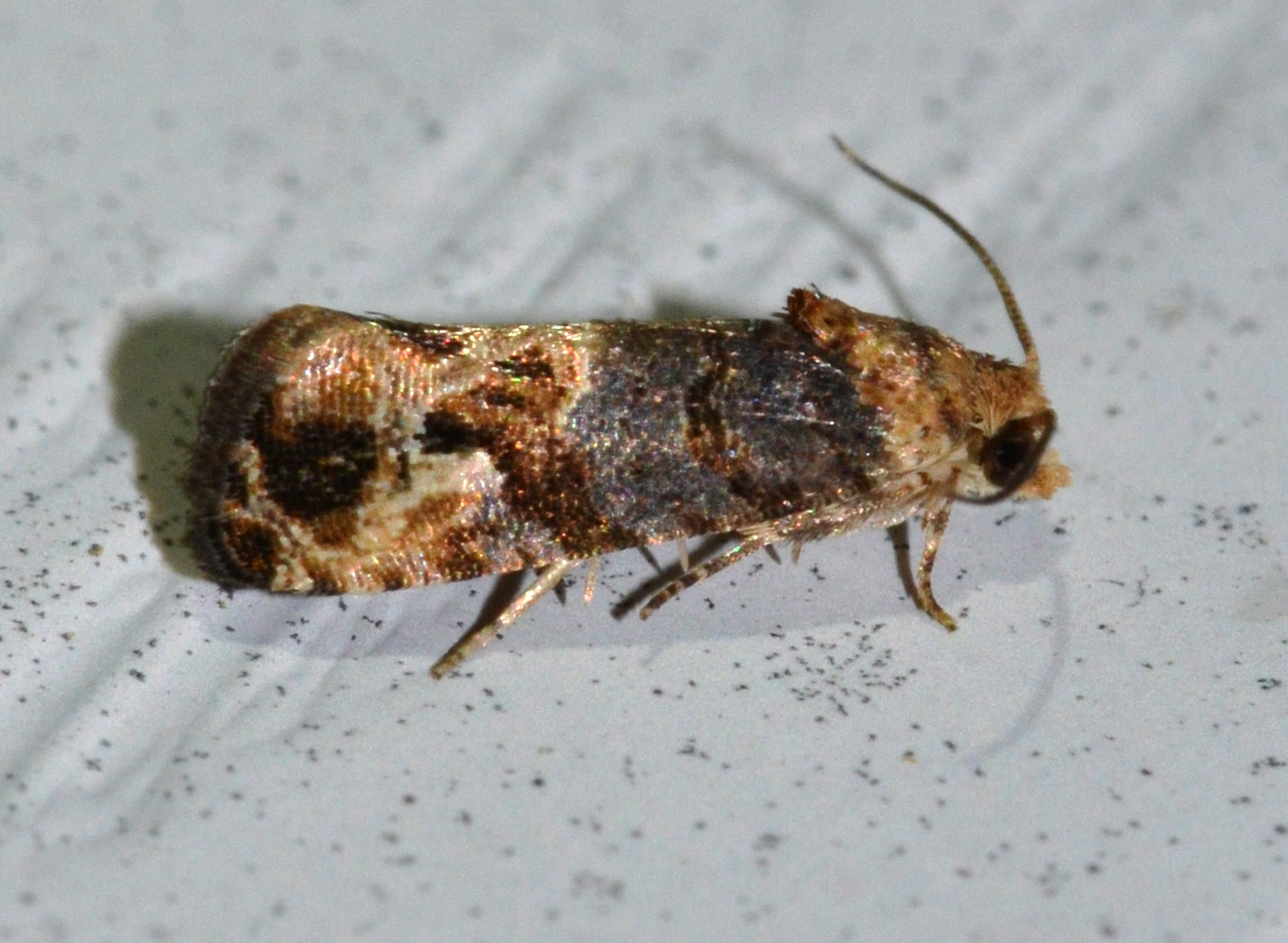

Scientific classification
- Kingdom: Animalia
- Phylum: Arthropoda
- Clade: Pancrustacea
- Class: Insecta
- Order: Lepidoptera
- Family: Tortricidae
- Genus: Paralobesia
- Species: P. viteana

Binomial name
- Paralobesia viteana (Clemens, 1860)

Synonyms
- Endopiza viteana Clemens, 1860; Penthina vitivorana Packard, 1869

= Paralobesia viteana =

Grape berry moth

North American moth species of agricultural importance (grape berry moth)

Paralobesia viteana, (Note: Paralobesia, "like the moth genus Lobesia"; viteana, "of Vitis", the grapevine.) the grape berry moth, is a moth of the family Tortricidae, found in Eastern North America and western Colorado, where it is an important agricultural pest in vineyards. The synonym Endopiza viteana is frequently used in literature, but was replaced by Paralobesia viteana per J.W. Brown (2006).

== Description ==
=== Caterpillar ===
Newly hatched larvae are about 1 mm long and creamy white or yellow-green in appearance. They turn purple as they mature and grow to a length of roughly 8 mm.

=== Adult ===
The wingspan of adult Paralobesia viteana specimens ranges from 8 to 13 mm. The forewings are brown with a mild purplish sheen and a band in the middle of the wing, with a wing pattern similar both to other Nearctic species of Paralobesia and to Lobesia botrana, with the latter unable to be separated from P. viteana on wing pattern alone. The lighter hindwings, which are more cream-colored, are folded beneath the forewings when in rest. The head and body of P. viteana are brown.

== Range and host plants ==
Paralobesia viteana is native to Eastern North America, with wild grape as ancestral host plant. In recent times, it has also been observed in western Colorado. The primary host plant in both areas is grape (Vitis spp.), both wild and cultivated variations, though documentation of P. viteana on other host plants, including sassafras and blackberry, exists. Because of the damage done by the larvae when feeding from the grape berries and blossoms, P. viteana is considered to be one of the worst insect pests on grape berries in the Eastern North American bioregion.

== Behaviour ==
Depending on weather and location, P. viteana occurs in two to four generations per year, with generations above a second being more common in the southern areas of its range but occasionally happening in the northern areas as well. The last generation overwinters in the pupal stage. Adults of the various generations of P. viteana are on wing from roughly March to August, depending on the weather and location.

The adults of the first flight emerge, after overwintering, during spring around the time of grapevine bloom. The females lay the eggs of the first generation separately on flowers or small berries. After about four to eight days the eggs hatch.

The first generation larvae feed on flowers, growing fruit clusters and tender stems from the outside, webbing the developing cluster together. As the caterpillars reach maturity, they leave the cluster to pupate by cutting part of a leaf and wrapping it around themselves to create a cocoon. Occasionally, they pupate within a webbed cluster.

The later generations of larvae do not feed externally, but tunnel into the berries, feeding from within. This causes red spots on the grape berries at the point of entry. Grapes affected in such a way are known as "stung" berries. A single caterpillar may go through two to six berries before pupating. Although early larvae of the first generation may cause serious damage by feeding on the blossoms, buds and developing berries, the later generations often cause the majority of damage to the grape harvest by causing parts of berries to ripen early and hollowing out berries, both reducing yield and increasing the risk of fungal infection and infection by fruit flies.

Larvae of the last generation overwinter in the pupal stage on the ground, in leaf litter.
