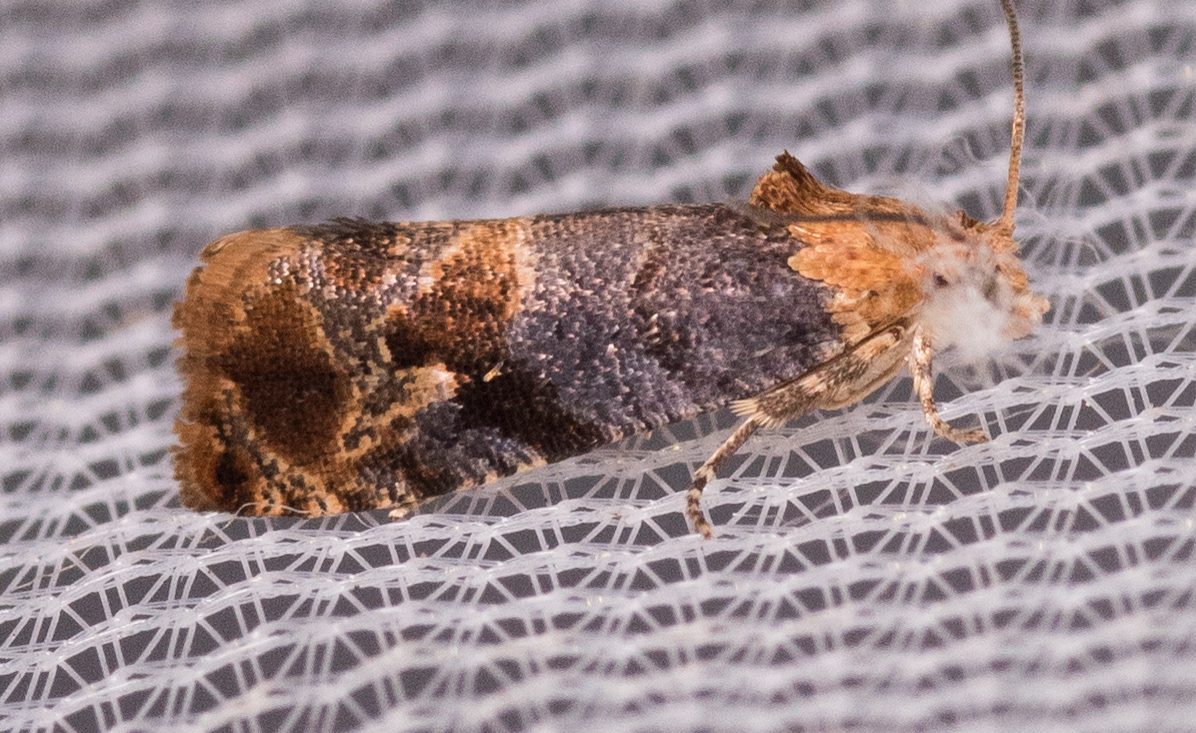

Scientific classification
- Domain: Eukaryota
- Kingdom: Animalia
- Phylum: Arthropoda
- Class: Insecta
- Order: Lepidoptera
- Family: Tortricidae
- Genus: Paralobesia
- Species: P. liriodendrana

Binomial name
- Paralobesia liriodendrana (Kearfott, 1904)

= Paralobesia liriodendrana =

Species of moth

Paralobesia liriodendrana, the tulip-tree leaftier moth, is a species of tortricid moth in the family Tortricidae.

The MONA or Hodges number for Paralobesia liriodendrana is 2711.
