= Eupoecilia eucalypta =

Scientific classification
- Kingdom: Animalia
- Phylum: Arthropoda
- Class: Insecta
- Order: Lepidoptera
- Family: Tortricidae
- Genus: Eupoecilia
- Species: E. eucalypta

Binomial name
- Eupoecilia eucalypta (Meyrick, 1928)

Synonyms
- Clysia eucalypta Meyrick, 1928

Species of moth

Eupoecilia eucalypta is a species of moth of the family Tortricidae. It is found in Sri Lanka.

This species has a wingspan of 10 mm.
