= Eupoecilia anebrica =

Scientific classification
- Domain: Eukaryota
- Kingdom: Animalia
- Phylum: Arthropoda
- Class: Insecta
- Order: Lepidoptera
- Family: Tortricidae
- Genus: Eupoecilia
- Species: E. anebrica

Binomial name
- Eupoecilia anebrica Diakonoff, 1983

Species of moth

Eupoecilia anebrica is a species of moth of the family Tortricidae. It was described from Mount Bandahara in Aceh, Indonesia.
