= Eupoecilia acrographa =

Scientific classification
- Domain: Eukaryota
- Kingdom: Animalia
- Phylum: Arthropoda
- Class: Insecta
- Order: Lepidoptera
- Family: Tortricidae
- Genus: Eupoecilia
- Species: E. acrographa

Binomial name
- Eupoecilia acrographa (Turner, 1916)

Synonyms
- Capua acrographa Turner, 1916

Species of moth

Eupoecilia acrographa is a species of moth of the family Tortricidae. It is found in Australia (Queensland and New South Wales).

The wingspan is 12 mm. The forewings are ochreous whitish. The hindwings are pale grey.
