= Eupoecilia wegneri =

Scientific classification
- Domain: Eukaryota
- Kingdom: Animalia
- Phylum: Arthropoda
- Class: Insecta
- Order: Lepidoptera
- Family: Tortricidae
- Genus: Eupoecilia
- Species: E. wegneri

Binomial name
- Eupoecilia wegneri (Diakonoff, 1941)

Synonyms
- Clysiana wegneri Diakonoff, 1941

Species of moth

Eupoecilia wegneri is a species of moth of the family Tortricidae. It is found on Java in Indonesia.
