= Eupoecilia neurosema =

Scientific classification
- Kingdom: Animalia
- Phylum: Arthropoda
- Class: Insecta
- Order: Lepidoptera
- Family: Tortricidae
- Genus: Eupoecilia
- Species: E. neurosema

Binomial name
- Eupoecilia neurosema (Meyrick, 1938)

Synonyms
- Clysia neurosema Meyrick, 1938

Species of moth

Eupoecilia neurosema is a species of moth of the family Tortricidae. It is found in Papua New Guinea.
