= Eupoecilia dynodesma =

Scientific classification
- Domain: Eukaryota
- Kingdom: Animalia
- Phylum: Arthropoda
- Class: Insecta
- Order: Lepidoptera
- Family: Tortricidae
- Genus: Eupoecilia
- Species: E. dynodesma

Binomial name
- Eupoecilia dynodesma (Diakonoff, 1971)

Synonyms
- Cryptocochylis dynodesma Diakonoff, 1971

Species of moth

The Eupoecilia dynodesma is a species of moth in the family Tortricidae, commonly found around the border area between India and Pakistan.
