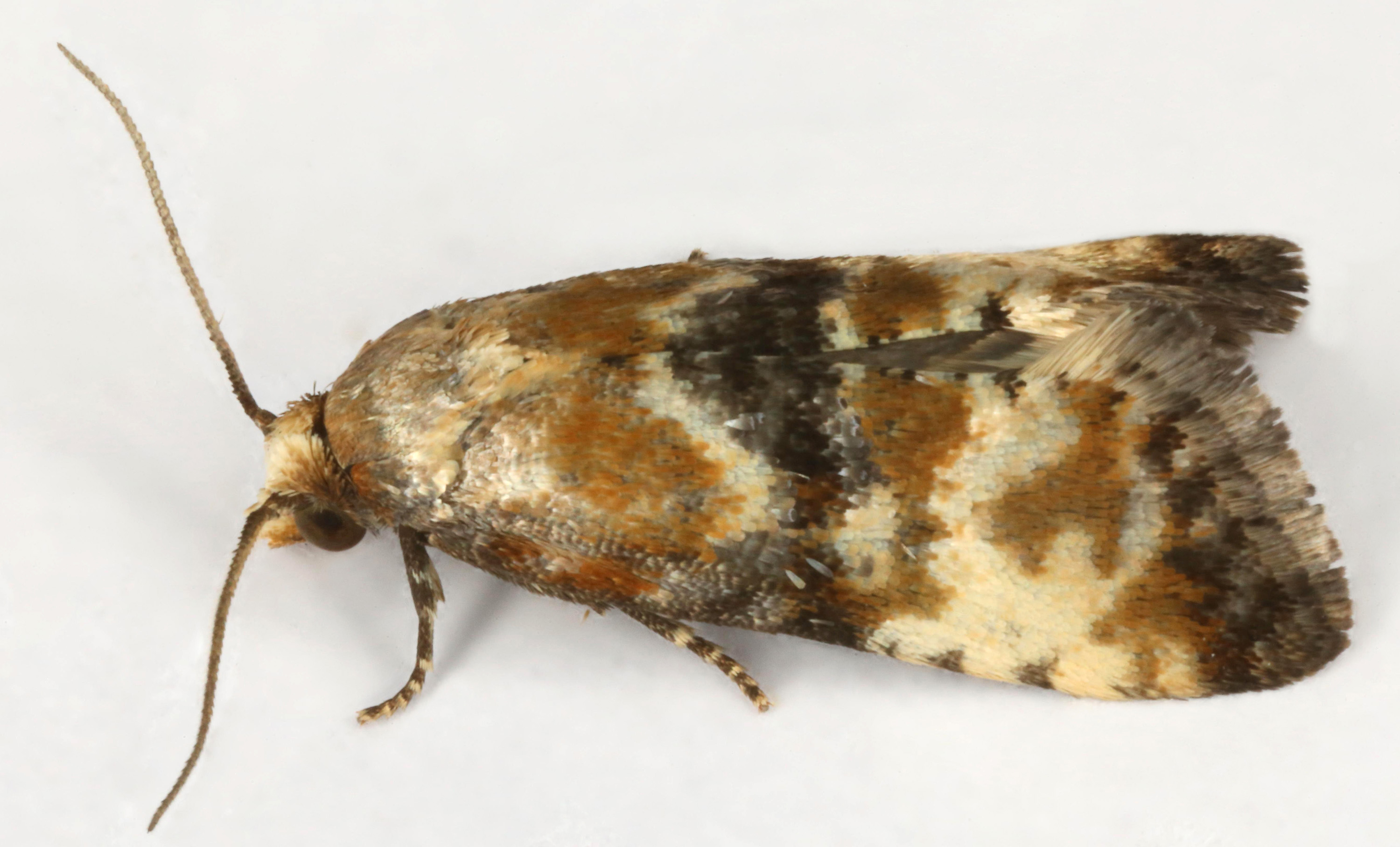

Scientific classification
- Kingdom: Animalia
- Phylum: Arthropoda
- Clade: Pancrustacea
- Class: Insecta
- Order: Lepidoptera
- Family: Tortricidae
- Genus: Eupoecilia
- Species: E. angustana

Binomial name
- Eupoecilia angustana (Hübner, 1799)

Synonyms
- Tortrix angustana Hubner, 1796-1799; Tortrix (Cochylis) cruentana Herrich-Schäffer, 1851; Phalaena fasciella Donovan, [1808]; Eupoecilia angustana thuleana Vaughan, 1880

= Eupoecilia angustana =

Species of moth

Eupoecilia angustana is a moth of the family Tortricidae. It is found in most of Europe to the southern part of the Urals, and across the Palearctic to China (Anhui, Beijing, Gansu, Heilongijiang, Henan, Jilin, Ningxia, Shaanxi, Shandong, Shanxi), Japan and Korea.

The wingspan is 10–15 mm.

The moth flies from June to September.

The larvae feed on Plantago, Achillea, Calluna, Origanum, Thymus and Solidago.

== Subspecies ==
Eupoecilia angustana thuleana is considered a distinct subspecies by some authors. It is found in Shetland.
