= Eupoecilia cracens =

Scientific classification
- Domain: Eukaryota
- Kingdom: Animalia
- Phylum: Arthropoda
- Class: Insecta
- Order: Lepidoptera
- Family: Tortricidae
- Genus: Eupoecilia
- Species: E. cracens

Binomial name
- Eupoecilia cracens Diakonoff, 1982

Species of moth

Eupoecilia cracens is a species of moth of the family Tortricidae first described by Alexey Diakonoff in 1982. It is found in Sri Lanka.

== Description ==
The wingspan of the male is 13 mm. Head and thorax pale ochreous. Frons whitish. Palpus whitish ochreous. Antenna pale ochreous. Abdomen pale ochreous. Forewings oblong, and costa curved at base. Apex pointed. Forewings pale golden ochreous with, greyish suffusion in costa. Costal half triangularly dilated upwards, which is suffused grey. Cilia glossy whitish ochreous. Hindwings pale ochreous. Whitish towards cell.
