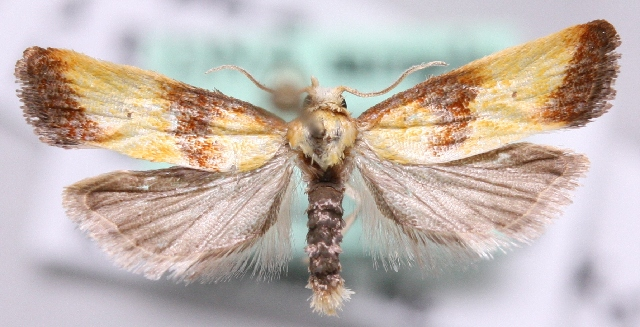

Scientific classification
- Domain: Eukaryota
- Kingdom: Animalia
- Phylum: Arthropoda
- Class: Insecta
- Order: Lepidoptera
- Family: Tortricidae
- Genus: Eupoecilia
- Species: E. sanguisorbana

Binomial name
- Eupoecilia sanguisorbana (Herrich-Schäffer, 1856)

Synonyms
- Tortrix sanguisorbana Herrich-Schäffer, 1856

= Eupoecilia sanguisorbana =

Species of moth

Eupoecilia sanguisorbana is a species of moth of the family Tortricidae. It is found in China (Hebei, Heilongjiang, Inner Mongolia), Kazakhstan, Kyrgyzstan and most of Europe.

The wingspan is 12–15 mm. Adults are on wing in June and July.

The larvae feed on Sanguisorba officinalis. Larvae can be found from February to September.
