= Eupoecilia kobeana =

Scientific classification
- Kingdom: Animalia
- Phylum: Arthropoda
- Class: Insecta
- Order: Lepidoptera
- Family: Tortricidae
- Genus: Eupoecilia
- Species: E. kobeana

Binomial name
- Eupoecilia kobeana Razowski, 1968

Species of moth

Eupoecilia kobeana is a species of moth of the family Tortricidae. It is found in China (Guangxi, Guizhou, Henan, Hunan, Yunnan), Taiwan, Japan, Korea and Russia.

The wingspan is 8.5–10.5 mm.
