= Eupoecilia taneces =

Scientific classification
- Domain: Eukaryota
- Kingdom: Animalia
- Phylum: Arthropoda
- Class: Insecta
- Order: Lepidoptera
- Family: Tortricidae
- Genus: Eupoecilia
- Species: E. taneces

Binomial name
- Eupoecilia taneces (Diakonoff, 1973)

Synonyms
- Aethes taneces Diakonoff, 1973

Species of moth

Eupoecilia taneces is a species of moth of the family Tortricidae. It is found in Papua New Guinea.
