= Eupoecilia aburica =

Scientific classification
- Domain: Eukaryota
- Kingdom: Animalia
- Phylum: Arthropoda
- Class: Insecta
- Order: Lepidoptera
- Family: Tortricidae
- Genus: Eupoecilia
- Species: E. aburica

Binomial name
- Eupoecilia aburica Razowski, 1993

Species of moth

Eupoecilia aburica is a species of moth of the family Tortricidae. It was described by Józef Razowski in 1993, and is found in Ghana.
