= Eupoecilia charixantha =

Scientific classification
- Kingdom: Animalia
- Phylum: Arthropoda
- Class: Insecta
- Order: Lepidoptera
- Family: Tortricidae
- Genus: Eupoecilia
- Species: E. charixantha

Binomial name
- Eupoecilia charixantha (Meyrick, 1928)

Synonyms
- Clysia charixantha Meyrick, 1928

Species of moth

Eupoecilia charixantha is a species of moth of the family Tortricidae first described by Edward Meyrick in 1928. It is found in Sri Lanka.
