= Eupoecilia inouei =

Scientific classification
- Kingdom: Animalia
- Phylum: Arthropoda
- Class: Insecta
- Order: Lepidoptera
- Family: Tortricidae
- Genus: Eupoecilia
- Species: E. inouei

Binomial name
- Eupoecilia inouei Kawabe, 1972

Species of moth

Eupoecilia inouei is a species of moth of the family Tortricidae. It is found in China (Guizhou, Hebei, Henan, Hunan, Jiangxi, Jilin, Ningxia, Shaanxi, Shanxi), Japan, Korea and Russia.

The wingspan is 13–16 mm.
