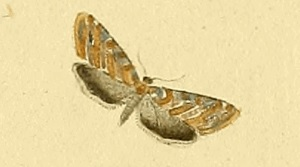

Scientific classification
- Kingdom: Animalia
- Phylum: Arthropoda
- Clade: Pancrustacea
- Class: Insecta
- Order: Lepidoptera
- Family: Tortricidae
- Genus: Eupoecilia
- Species: E. cebrana

Binomial name
- Eupoecilia cebrana (Hubner, [1811-1813])

Synonyms
- Tortrix cebrana Hubner, [1811-1813]; Tortrix febrana Herrich-Schaffer, 1847; Coccyx zebrana Treitschke, 1830

= Eupoecilia cebrana =

Species of moth

Eupoecilia cebrana is a species of moth of the family Tortricidae. It is found in Sweden, France, Germany, Denmark, Poland, Austria, Slovakia, Estonia, Latvia, Lithuania, Russia, North Macedonia and Greece.

The wingspan is 15–17 mm. Adults are on wing in May and from July to August.

The larvae feed on Helichrysum species, including Helichrysum arenarium.
