= Eupoecilia lata =

Scientific classification
- Kingdom: Animalia
- Phylum: Arthropoda
- Class: Insecta
- Order: Lepidoptera
- Family: Tortricidae
- Genus: Eupoecilia
- Species: E. lata

Binomial name
- Eupoecilia lata Razowski, 1968

Species of moth

Eupoecilia lata is a species of moth of the family Tortricidae. It is found in Sikkim, India.
