= Eupoecilia reliquatrix =

Scientific classification
- Kingdom: Animalia
- Phylum: Arthropoda
- Class: Insecta
- Order: Lepidoptera
- Family: Tortricidae
- Genus: Eupoecilia
- Species: E. reliquatrix

Binomial name
- Eupoecilia reliquatrix (Meyrick, 1928)

Synonyms
- Clysia reliquatrix Meyrick, 1928; Clysia opisthodonta Diakonoff, 1941; Clysia opistodonta Diakonoff, 1941

Species of moth

Eupoecilia reliquatrix is a species of moth of the family Tortricidae. It is found on Java in Indonesia.
