= Eupoecilia scytalephora =

Scientific classification
- Domain: Eukaryota
- Kingdom: Animalia
- Phylum: Arthropoda
- Class: Insecta
- Order: Lepidoptera
- Family: Tortricidae
- Genus: Eupoecilia
- Species: E. scytalephora

Binomial name
- Eupoecilia scytalephora (Diakonoff, 1952)

Synonyms
- Clysiana scytalephora Diakonoff, 1952

Species of moth

Eupoecilia scytalephora is a species of moth of the family Tortricidae. It is found on New Guinea.
