= Eupoecilia quinaspinalis =

Scientific classification
- Kingdom: Animalia
- Phylum: Arthropoda
- Class: Insecta
- Order: Lepidoptera
- Family: Tortricidae
- Genus: Eupoecilia
- Species: E. quinaspinalis

Binomial name
- Eupoecilia quinaspinalis X.Zhang & H.H.Li, 2008

Species of moth

Eupoecilia quinaspinalis is a species of moth of the family Tortricidae. It is found in China (Fujian, Hainan).

The wingspan is 11–13 mm.
