= Eupoecilia crocina =

Scientific classification
- Kingdom: Animalia
- Phylum: Arthropoda
- Class: Insecta
- Order: Lepidoptera
- Family: Tortricidae
- Genus: Eupoecilia
- Species: E. crocina

Binomial name
- Eupoecilia crocina Razowski, 1968

Species of moth

Eupoecilia crocina is a species of moth of the family Tortricidae. It is found in Afghanistan and Tajikistan.

== Subspecies ==
- Eupoecilia crocina crocina
- Eupoecilia crocina hissarica Kuznetzov, 1976 (Tajikistan)
