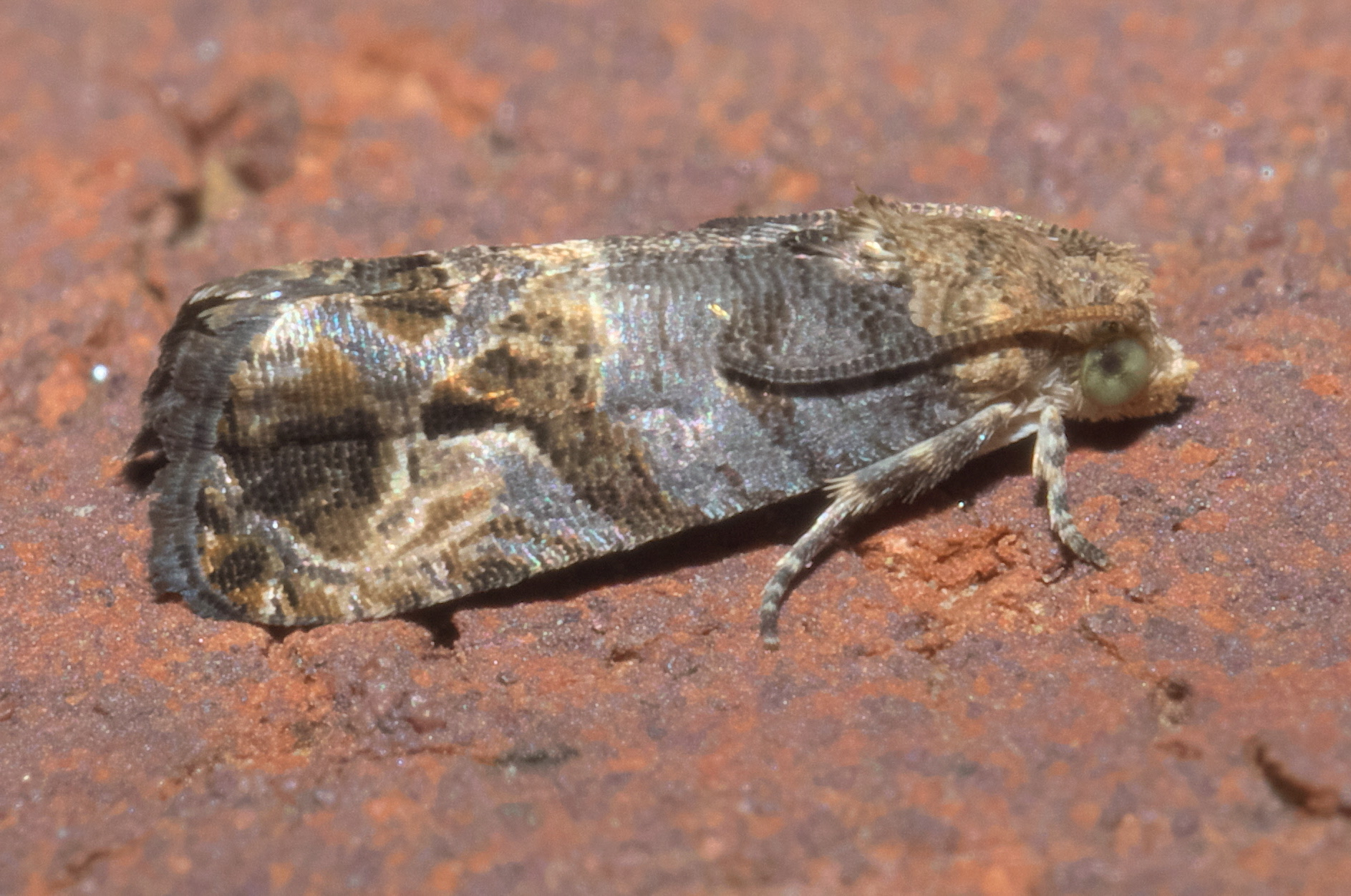

Scientific classification
- Kingdom: Animalia
- Phylum: Arthropoda
- Clade: Pancrustacea
- Class: Insecta
- Order: Lepidoptera
- Family: Tortricidae
- Tribe: Olethreutini
- Genus: Paralobesia; Obraztsov, 1953

= Paralobesia =

Genus of tortrix moths

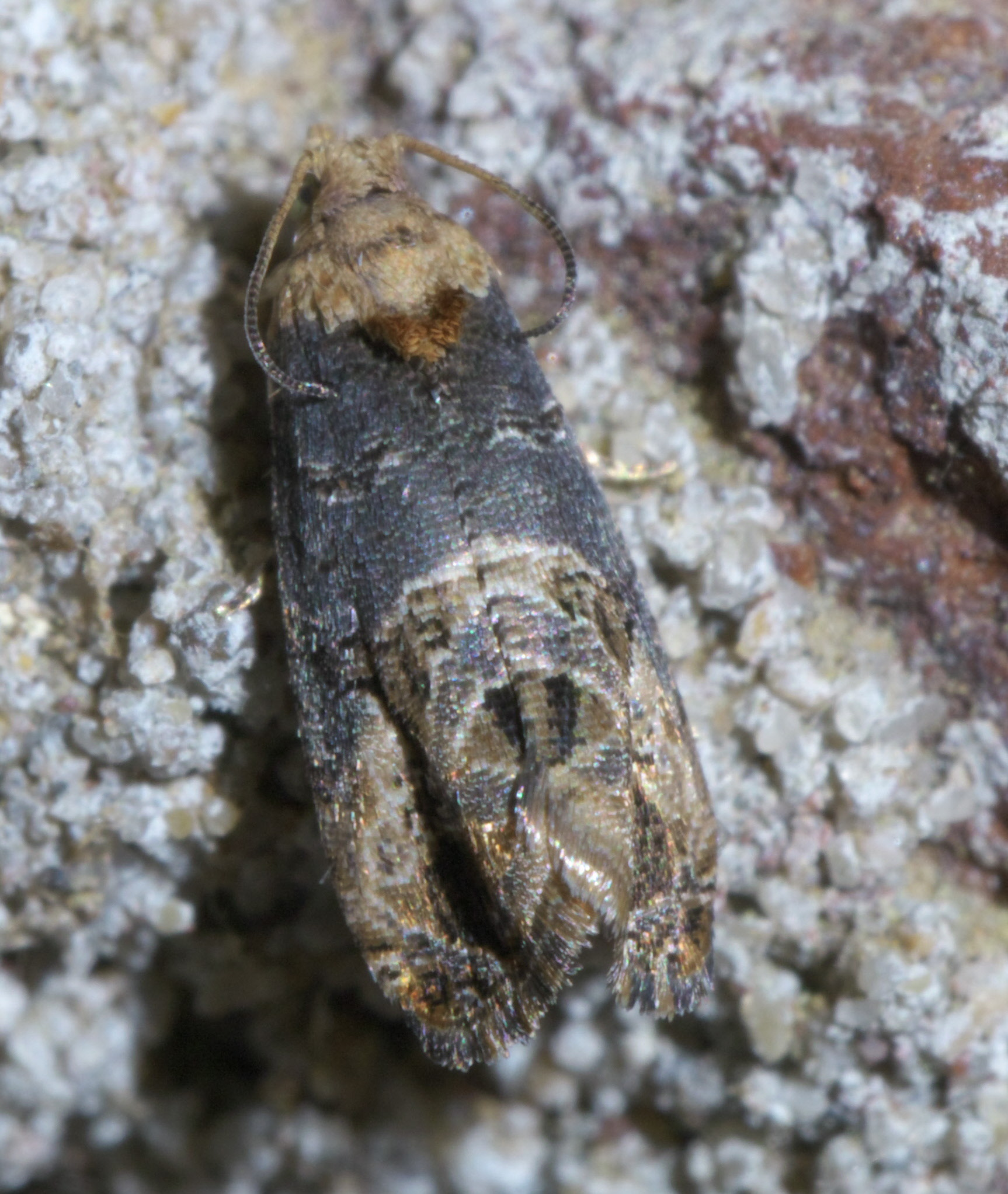
Paralobesia viteana, grape berry moth, size: 5.9 mm

Paralobesia is a genus of moths belonging to the subfamily Olethreutinae of the family Tortricidae. Paralobesia Obraztsov, 1953 is a genus of small moths in the family Tortricidae. Although Holarctic in distribution, the vast majority of the species are restricted to the Nearctic Region.

== Species ==
- Paralobesia aemulana (Heinrich, 1926)
- Paralobesia alafusca Royals and Gilligan, 2019
- Paralobesia albiterminana Royals and Dang, 2019
- Paralobesia andereggiana (Herrich-Schäffer, 1851)
- Paralobesia annetteae Royals and Gilligan, 2019
- Paralobesia aruncana (Kearfott, 1907)
- Paralobesia blandula (Heinrich, 1926)
- Paralobesia crassa Royals and Gilligan, 2019
- Paralobesia crispans Royals and Gilligan, 2019
- Paralobesia cyclopiana (Heinrich, 1926)
- Paralobesia cypripediana (Forbes, 1923)
- Paralobesia dividuana Royals and Gilligan, 2019
- Paralobesia exasperana (McDunnough, 1938)
- Paralobesia glenni Royals and Gilligan, 2019
- Paralobesia hodgesi Royals and Gilligan, 2019
- Paralobesia kearfotti Royals and Gilligan, 2019
- Paralobesia landryi Royals and Gilligan, 2019
- Paralobesia liriodendrana (Kearfott, 1904)
- Paralobesia maculana Royals and Gilligan, 2019
- Paralobesia magnoliana (Kearfott, 1907)
- Paralobesia marilynae Royals and Gilligan, 2018
- Paralobesia monotropana (Heinrich, 1926)
- Paralobesia monslata Royals and Gilligan, 2019
- Paralobesia moritzi Royals and Gilligan, 2019
- Paralobesia pallicircula Royals and Gilligan, 2019
- Paralobesia pallida Royals and Gilligan, 2019
- Paralobesia palliolana (McDunnough, 1938)
- Paralobesia parsaura Royals and Gilligan, 2019
- Paralobesia piceana (Freeman, 1941)
- Paralobesia piperae Royals and Gilligan, 2019
- Paralobesia rhoifructana (Kearfott, 1907)
- Paralobesia ridingensi Royals and Gilligan, 2019
- Paralobesia sambuci (Clarke, 1953)
- Paralobesia slingerlandana (Kearfott, 1904)
- Paralobesia spiraeifoliana (Heinrich, 1923)
- Paralobesia tenuis Royals and Gilligan, 2019
- Paralobesia vernoniana (Kearfott, 1907)
- Paralobesia viteana (Clemens, 1860)
- Paralobesia wontonana Royals and Gilligan, 2019
- Paralobesia worthi Royals and Gilligan, 2019
- Paralobesia wrighti Royals and Gilligan, 2019
- Paralobesia yaracana (Kearfott, 1907)

== See also ==
- List of Tortricidae genera
