= Eupoecilia diana =

Scientific classification
- Kingdom: Animalia
- Phylum: Arthropoda
- Class: Insecta
- Order: Lepidoptera
- Family: Tortricidae
- Genus: Eupoecilia
- Species: E. diana

Binomial name
- Eupoecilia diana Razowski, 1968

Species of moth

Eupoecilia diana is a species of moth of the family Tortricidae. It is found on the Solomon Islands east of New Guinea.
