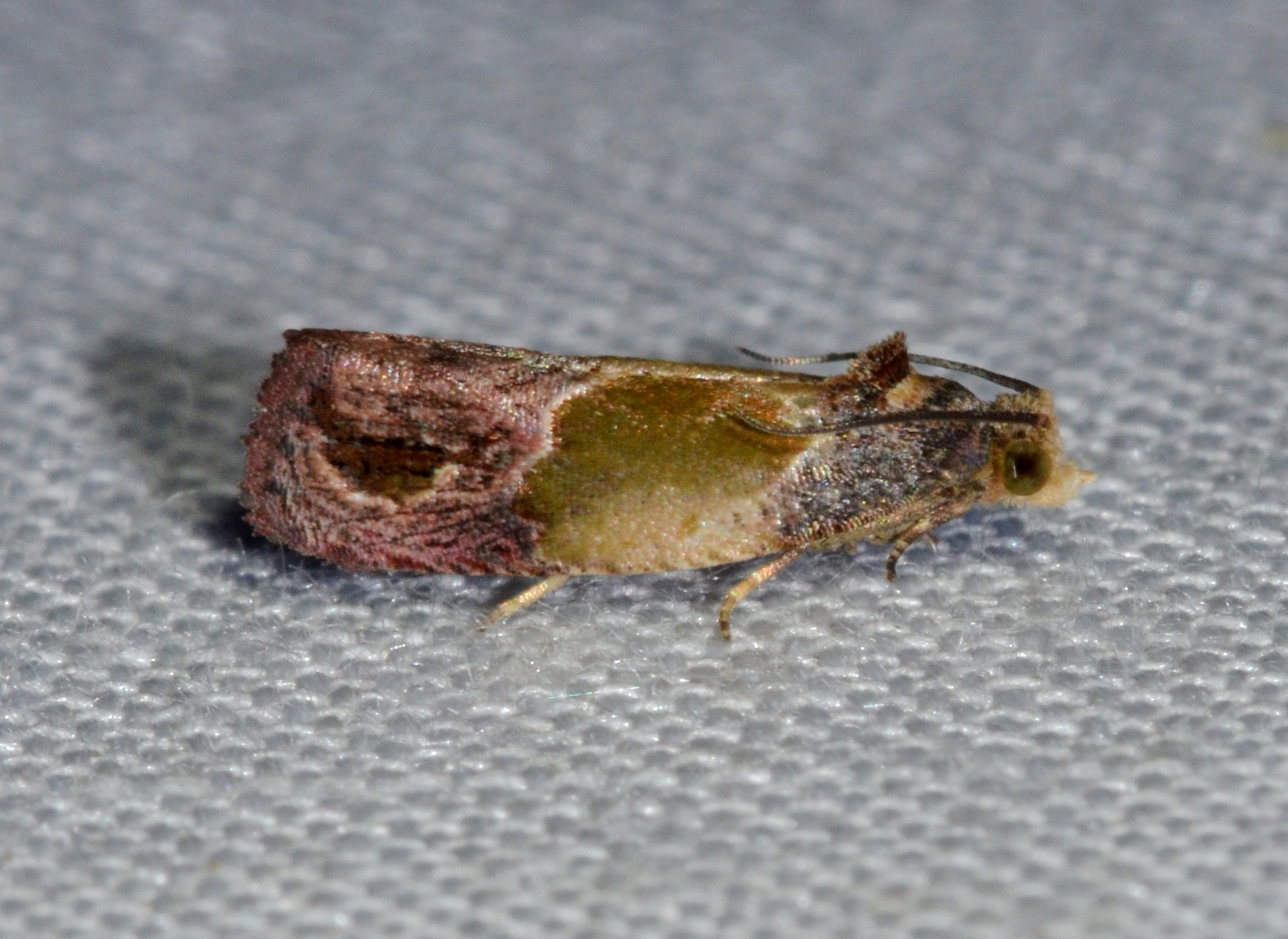

Scientific classification
- Kingdom: Animalia
- Phylum: Arthropoda
- Clade: Pancrustacea
- Class: Insecta
- Order: Lepidoptera
- Family: Tortricidae
- Genus: Eumarozia
- Species: E. malachitana

Binomial name
- Eumarozia malachitana (Zeller, 1875)

Synonyms
- Grapholitha (Poecilochroma) malachitana Zeller, 1875

= Eumarozia malachitana =

Species of moth

Eumarozia malachitana, the sculptured moth, is a species of moth of the family Tortricidae. It is found in eastern North America, where it has been recorded from Alabama, Arkansas, California, Florida, Georgia, Illinois, Indiana, Iowa, Kentucky, Louisiana, Maine, Maryland, Massachusetts, Minnesota, Mississippi, Missouri, New Jersey, North Carolina, Ohio, Oklahoma, Ontario, Pennsylvania, South Carolina, Tennessee, Texas, Virginia and West Virginia.

The wingspan is 11.5–16 mm. Adults are on wing in July and from September to October.

The larvae feed on Ostrya virginiana, Diospyros virginiana, Pyrus communis, Cassia, Gomphrena and Manilkara species.

== Life cycle ==
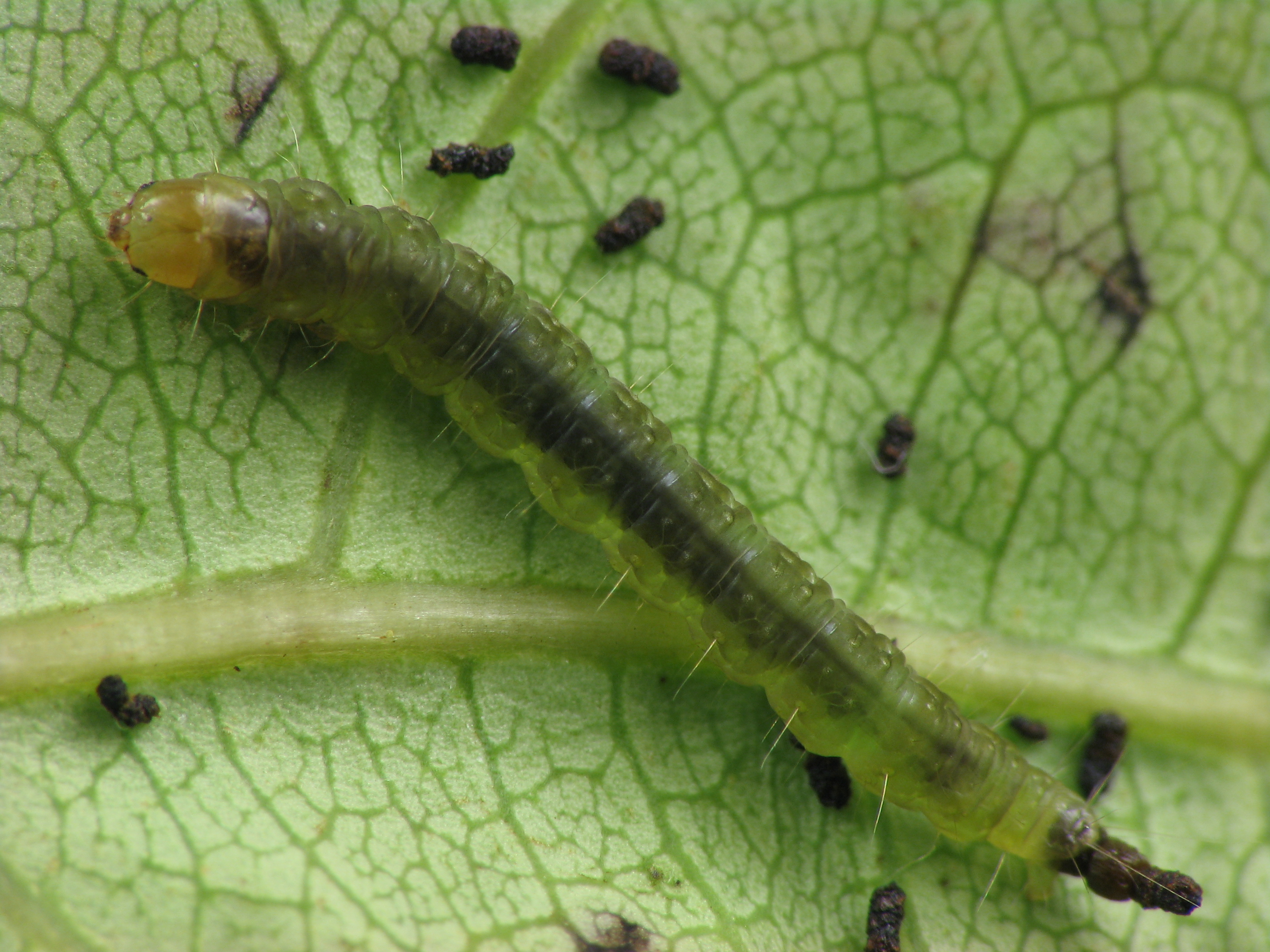
Larva inside leaf shelter

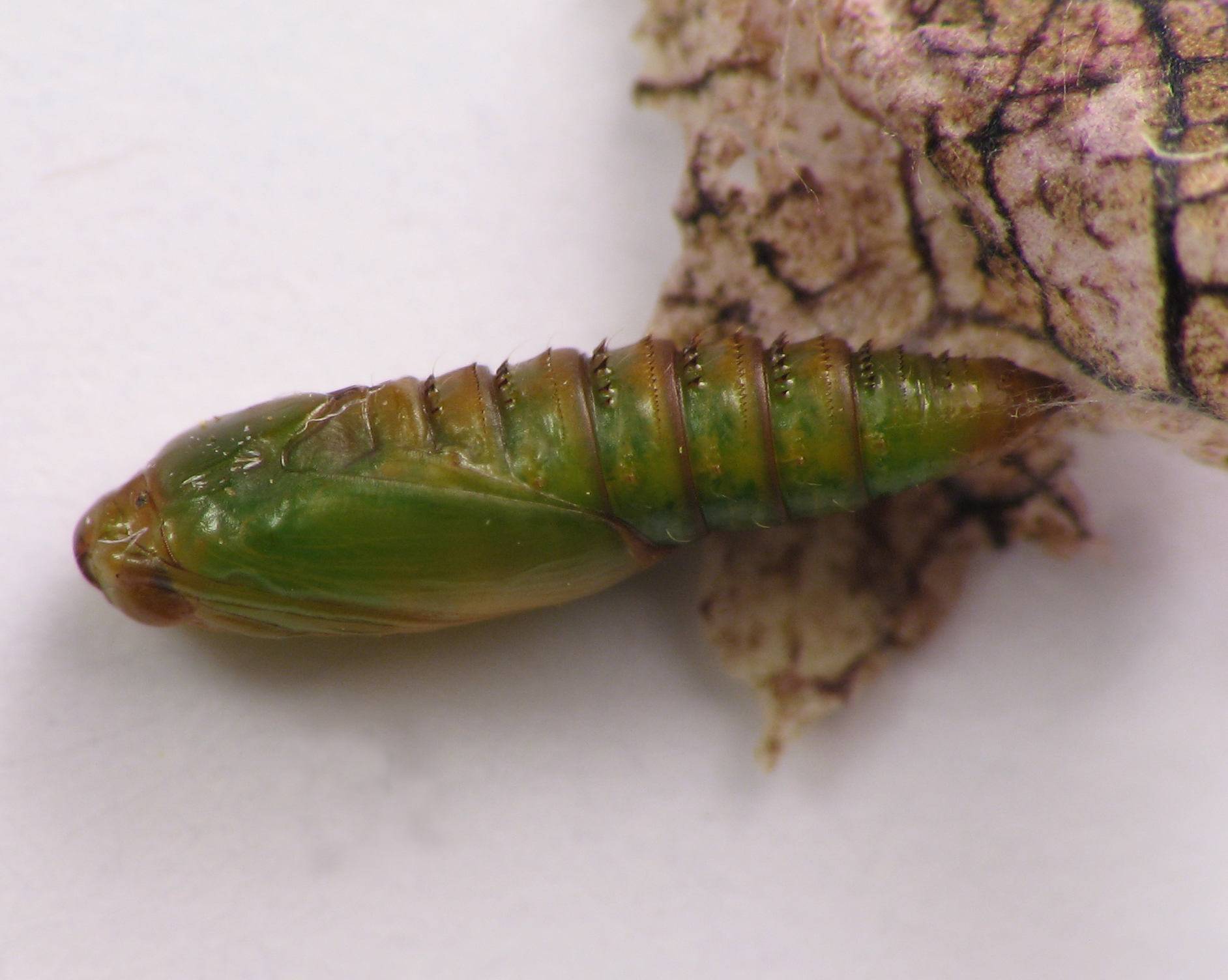
Pupa

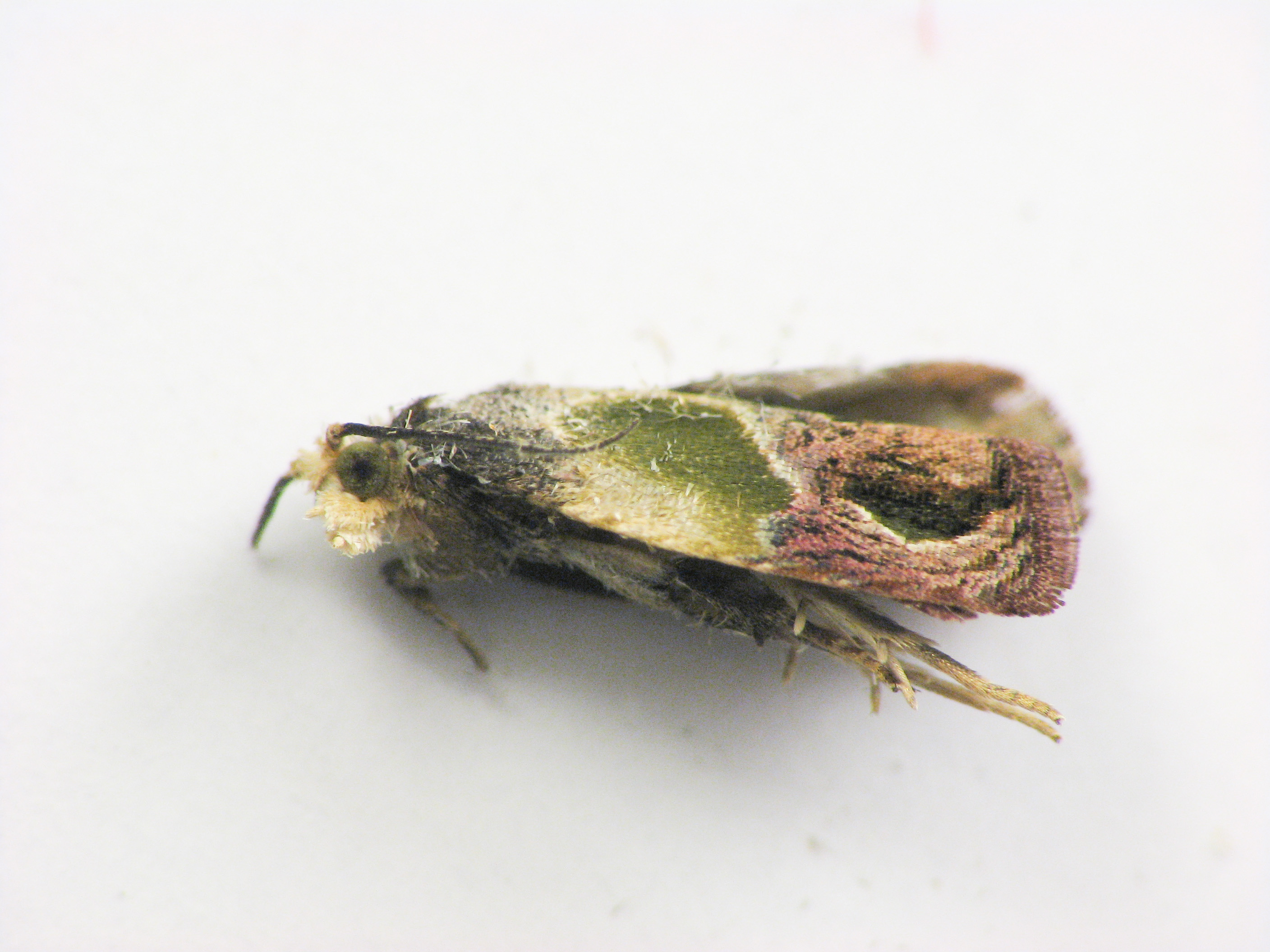
Adult
