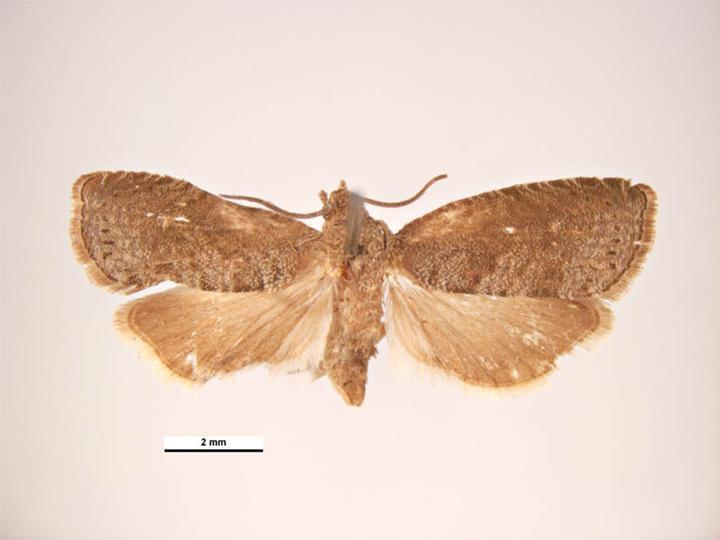
- Dorsal view
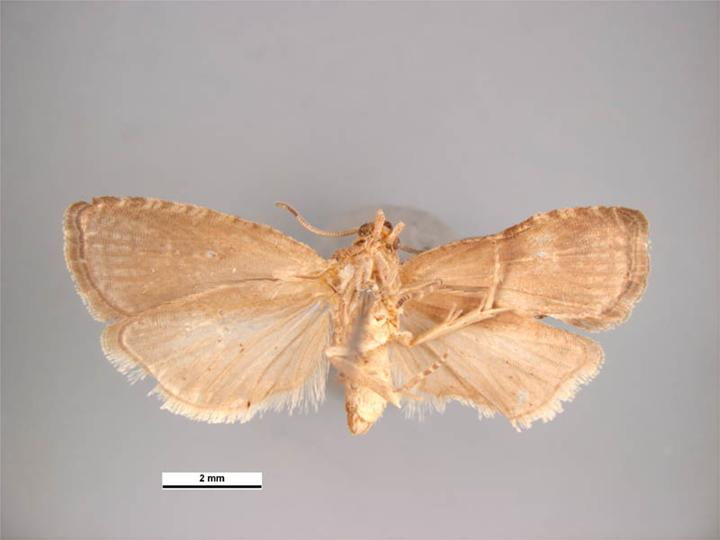
- Ventral view

Scientific classification
- Kingdom: Animalia
- Phylum: Arthropoda
- Clade: Pancrustacea
- Class: Insecta
- Order: Lepidoptera
- Family: Tortricidae
- Genus: Grapholita
- Species: G. molesta

Binomial name
- Grapholita molesta (Busck, 1916)

Synonyms
- Laspeyresia molesta Busck, 1916; Cydia molesta

= Grapholita molesta =

Grapholitha molesta

Oriental fruit moth

Grapholita molesta, the oriental fruit moth or peach moth, is a moth of the family Tortricidae. It is native to China, but was introduced to Japan and North America and is now also found in Europe, Asia and South America along with Hawaii, Morocco, Mauritius, South Africa, Australia and New Zealand

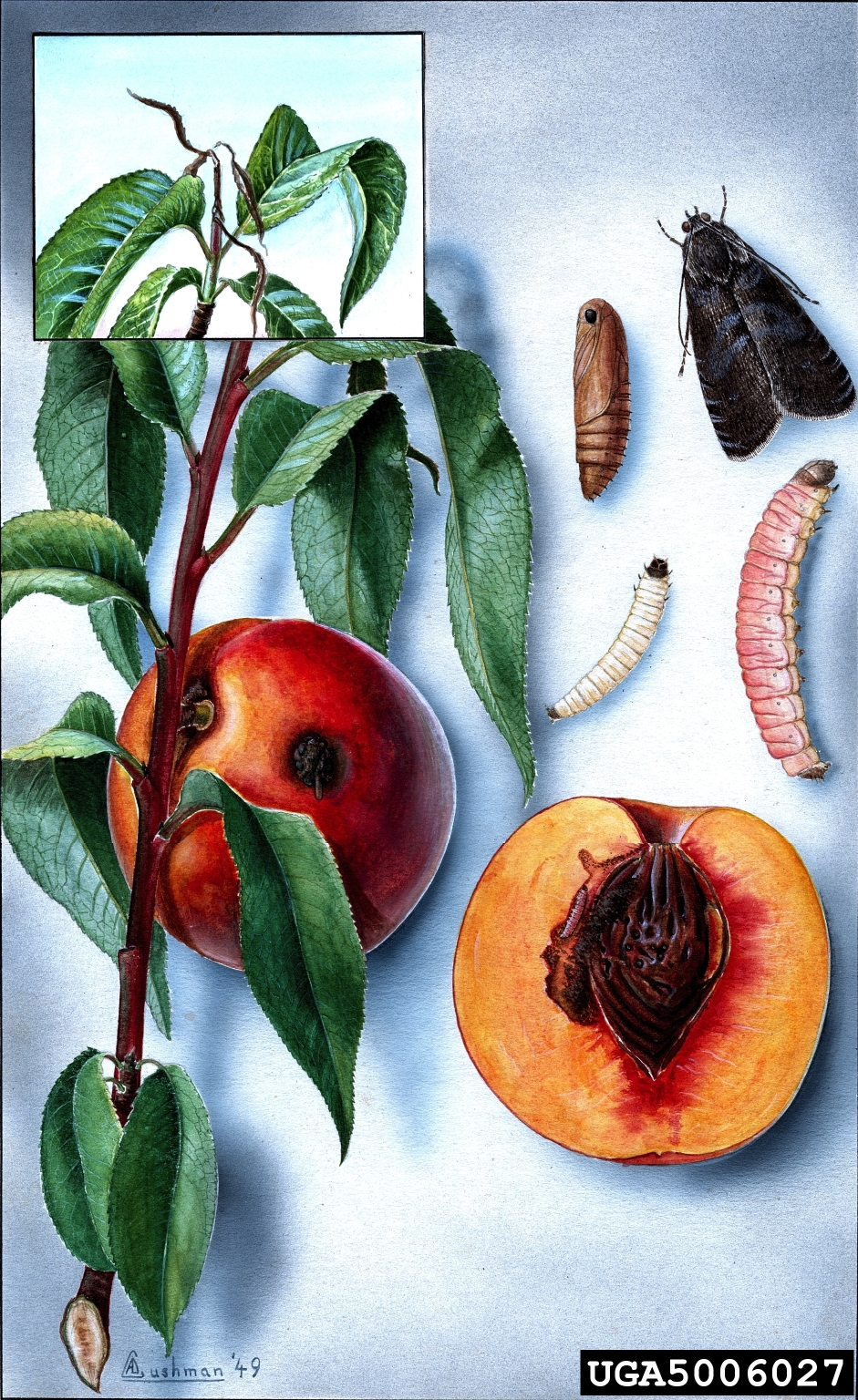
Illustration of life cycle

The wingspan ranges from about 9-13 mm. There are four to seven generations per year. It overwinters in a fully grown larval stage in a cocoon inside bark crevices, orchard waste, weeds, and fallen fruit. When larvae emerge and burrow into trees, infected shoots will begin to wilt and leaves will dry up, causing premature flagging, an early symptom of the moth's damaging "shoot strike." Later generations of larvae bore into developing fruit and exit from the side, leaving behind large holes on the calyx and flesh of the fruit and a crumbly brown substance called frass, an insect waste product.

The larvae feed on peach, apple, quince, pear, plum, cherry, apricot and nectarines, along with other drupes and pomes.
