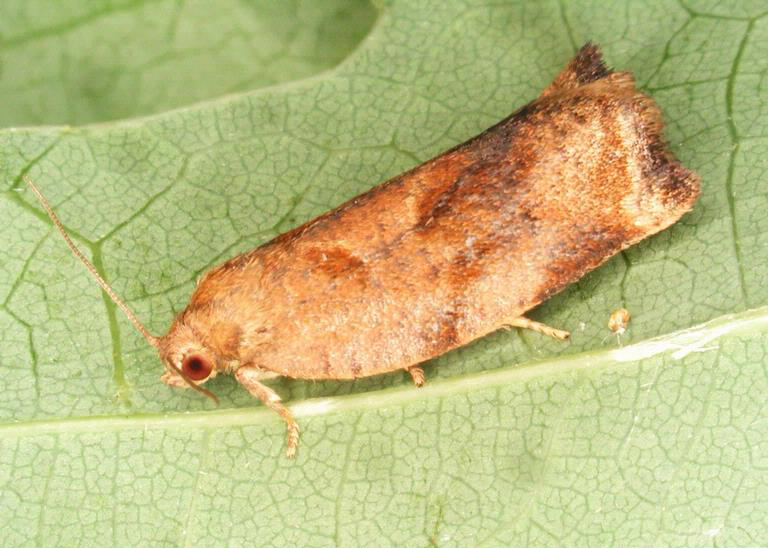

Scientific classification
- Kingdom: Animalia
- Phylum: Arthropoda
- Clade: Pancrustacea
- Class: Insecta
- Order: Lepidoptera
- Family: Tortricidae
- Genus: Archips
- Species: A. rosana

Binomial name
- Archips rosana (Linnaeus, 1758)

Synonyms
- Phalaena (Tortrix) rosana Linnaeus, 1758; Tortrix acerana Hubner, [1796-1799]; Phalaena (Tortrix) ameriana Linnaeus, 1758; Phalaena americana Gmelin, 1788; Phalaena (Tortrix) amerina Linnaeus, 1761; Phalaena (Tortrix) avellana Linnaeus, 1758; Cacoecia hewittana Busck, 1920; Tortrix laevigana [Denis & Schiffermuller], 1775; Tortrix levigana Illiger, 1801; Lozotaenia nebulana Stephens, 1834; Cacoecia rosana ab. obscura Dufrane, 1944; Cacoecia rosana ab. ochracea Dufrane, 1945; Cacoecia rosana var. orientana Krulikowsky, 1909; Tortrix oxyacanthana Hubner, [1796-1799]; Cacoecia rosana var. splendana Kennel, 1910; Tortrix testaceana Eversmann, 1844; Pyralis variana Fabricius, 1787

= Archips rosana =

Rose leaf roller moth

Archips rosana, the rose tortrix, is a moth of the family Tortricidae. It is found in both the Palearctic and Nearctic realms.

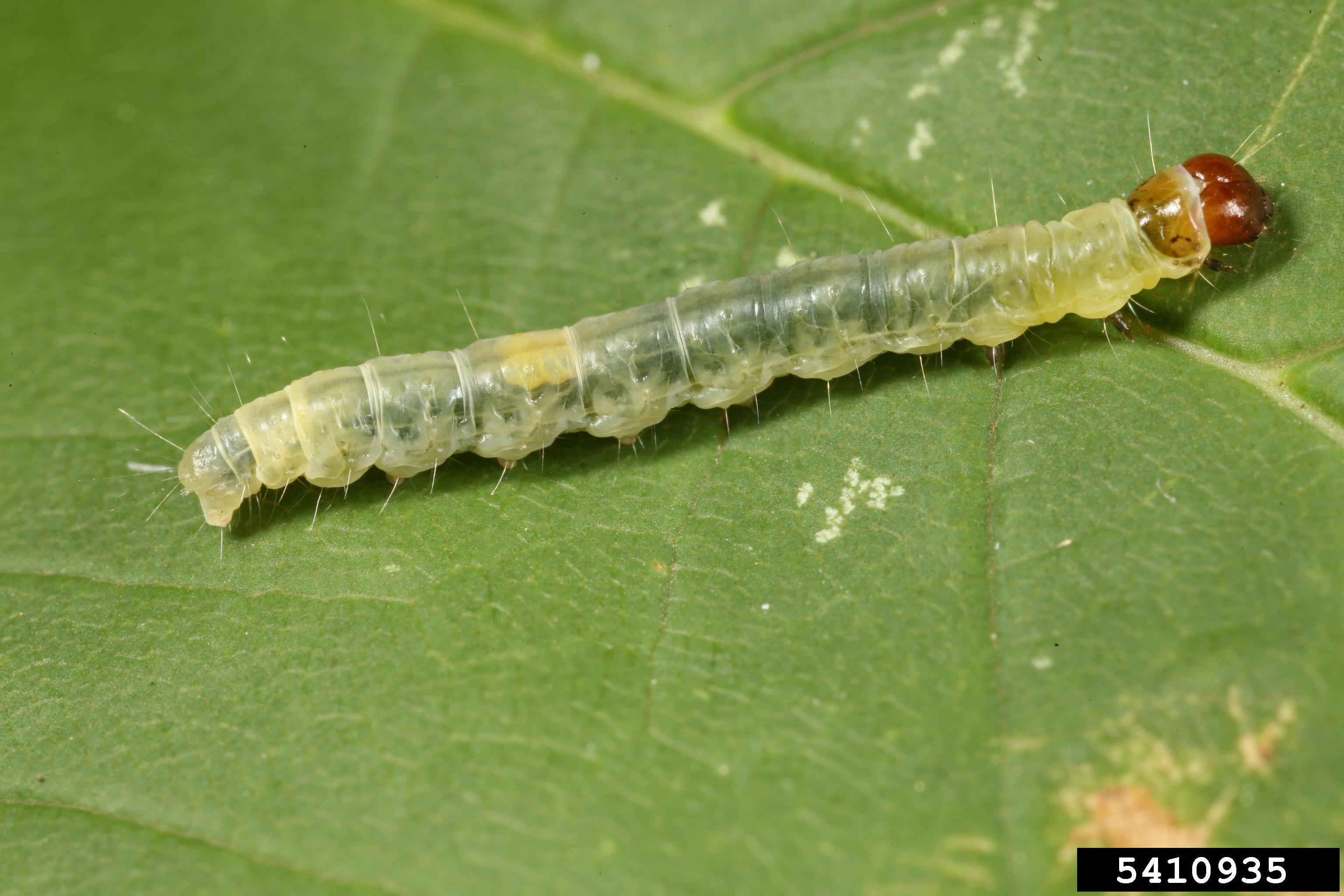
Larva

The wingspan is 15–24 mm. The forewings have a sinuate, vertical termen. sinuate. The costal fold from base to beyond middle, is irregular and light brown, sometimes reddish-tinged, in female darker-strigulated. There is a dorsal spot near the base. The anterior edge of the central fascia is sinuate. There is a suffused costal patch emitting an interrupted stria darker brown, in the female sometimes nearly obsolete and some dark terminal strigulae. The hindwings are grey, apex usually more or less orange. The larva is dark olive-green; dorsal line darker; tubercular spots white; head brown; plate of 2 blackish, anteriorly whitish. Julius von Kennel provides a full description.

The moths are on wing from May to August depending on the location.

The larvae feed within rolled leaves of various fruit plants such as raspberry, as well as cultivated rose. Pupation takes place from April to May. The species overwinters as an egg.
