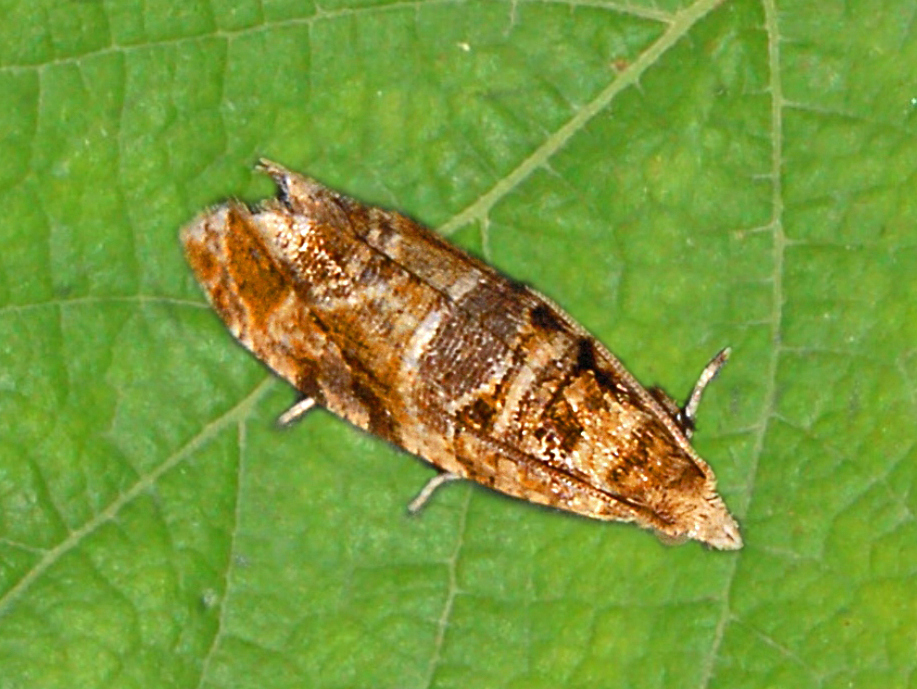
- Adult of Lobesia botrana

Scientific classification
- Kingdom: Animalia
- Phylum: Arthropoda
- Class: Insecta
- Order: Lepidoptera
- Family: Tortricidae
- Genus: Lobesia
- Species: L. botrana

Binomial name
- Lobesia botrana ([ Denis & Schiffermüller, 1775])

Synonyms
- Lobesia (Lobesia) botrana

= Lobesia botrana =

European grapevine moth

European grapevine moth

Lobesia botrana, the European grapevine moth or European grape worm, is a moth of the family Tortricidae.

== Distribution ==
This species is native to Southern Italy. It can be found in Southern Europe, North Africa, Anatolia and the Caucasus. Recently it has been introduced into Japan, Chile and Argentina, however on July 5, 2021, Senasa Argentina (the National Food Safety and Quality Service) declared the Departments of Cafayate and Concordia successfully eradicated.

== Description ==
Lobesia botrana can reach a length of 6–8 millimetres (0.24–0.31 in), with a wingspan of 12–13 mm. The females are slightly larger. The external surface of the forewings is mottled with tan-brown, greyish and dark-brown blotches. The rear wings are gray with a fringed border. Larvae can reach a length of 8–9 millimetres (0.31–0.35 in). They are yellowish green to light brown with a light yellow head.

== Biology ==
The larvae mainly feed on the flowers and fruit of grape (Vitis vinifera) and spurge laurel (Daphne gnidium), but it has also been reported on several other plants (Rubus fruticosus, Ribes sp., Olea europaea, Prunus avium, Prunus domestica, Actinidia chinensis, Punica granatum, etc.). Lobesia botrana normally has two - three generations in Europe. Larvae develop in 20 to 30 days. Pupae overwinter inside a silken cocoon.

This species is considered a major vineyard pest in its native range, as the larvae feed on the interior of grapes, hollow them out and leave excrement.

== An invasive species ==
The moth was found in the Napa Valley of California in September 2009, the first record in the United States. Confirmation of that detection led to increased trapping and surveys that have since detected the pest at several sites in the county. On March 9, 2010, the California Department of Food and Agriculture (CDFA) announced it had established a quarantine of 162 square miles (420 km^{2}) including portions of Napa, Sonoma and Solano counties. The quarantine affects movement of host material from inside the infested area. As of May 12, 2010, Fresno county was also placed under quarantine after traps near Kingsburg, California contained two specimens within 2 miles (3.2 km) of one another. Mexico has also notified the USDA that no fruit from this county will be accepted for import into Mexico which will greatly impact California stonefruit and grapes.

In August 2016, with no moths found since June 2014, the state declared that Napa County, and California, were free of the invasive species.

== Bibliography ==
- Coscollá Ramón R. 1998. Polillas del racimo (Lobesia botrana Den. Y Shiff.). In Los parasitos de la vid, estrategias de proteccion razonada. Madrid, Spain. pp. 29–42.
- Del Tío R, Martínez JL, Ocete R, Ocete ME. 2001. Study of the relationship between sex pheromone trap catches of Lobesia botrana (Den. & Schiff.) (Lep., Tortricidae) and the accumulation of degree-days in Sherry vineyards (SW of Spain). J. Appl. Ent. 125: 9–14.
- Denis, J. N. C. M. und Ignaz Schiffermüller (1775): Systematisches Verzeichniß der Schmetterlinge der Wienergegend herausgegeben von einigen Lehrern am k. + k. Theresianum. Wien
- Gabel B, Mocko V. 1986. A functional simulation of European vine moth Lobesia botrana Den. Et Schiff. (Lep., Torticidae) population development. J. Appl. Ent. 101: 121–127.
- Gallardo A, Ocete R, López MA, Maistrello L, Ortega F, Semedo A, Soria FJ. 2009. Forecasting the flight activity of Lobesia botrana (Denis & Schiffermüller) (Lepidoptera, Torticidae) in Southwestern Spain. J. Appl. Entomol. 133: 626–632.
- Moreau J, Benrey B, Thiéry. 2006. Grape variety affects larval performance and also female reproductive performance of the European grapevine moth Lobesia botrana (Lepidoptera: Tortricidae). Bull. Entomol. Res. 96: 205–212
- Torres-Vila LM, Stockel J, Roehrich R, Rodríguez-Molina MC. 1997. The relation between dispersal and survival of Lobesia botrana larvae and their density in vine inflorescences. Entomol. Exp. Appl. 84: 109–114.
- Zangheri S, Briolini G, Cravedi P, Duso C, Molinari F, Pasqualini E. 1992. Lobesia botrana (Denis & Schiffermüller). In Lepidotteri dei fruttiferi e della vite. Milan, Italy. pp. 85–88.
