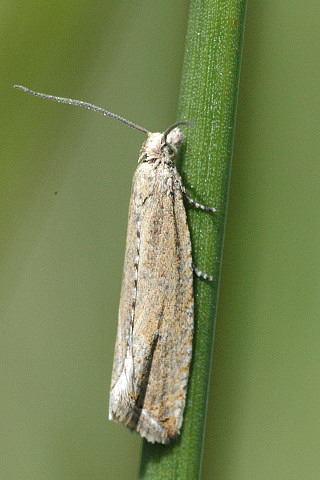
- Bactra lancealana

Scientific classification
- Kingdom: Animalia
- Phylum: Arthropoda
- Clade: Pancrustacea
- Class: Insecta
- Order: Lepidoptera
- Infraorder: Heteroneura
- Clade: Eulepidoptera
- Clade: Ditrysia
- Clade: Apoditrysia
- Superfamily: Tortricoidea; Latreille, 1803
- Family: Tortricidae; Latreille, 1803

Subfamilies & tribes
- Chlidanotinae; Tortricinae; Olethreutinae; See also Taxonomy of Tortricidae for full list of genera.

Diversity
- Over 1,050 genera Over 10,350 species

Synonyms
- Olethreutidae

= Tortricidae =

Tortricidae Temporal range: Eocene–Present

Family of tortrix moths

The Tortricidae are a family of moths, commonly known as tortrix moths or leafroller moths, in the order Lepidoptera. This large family has over 11,000 species described, and is the sole member of the superfamily Tortricoidea, although the genus Heliocosma is sometimes placed within this superfamily. Many of these are economically important pests. Olethreutidae is a junior synonym. The typical resting posture is with the wings folded back, producing a rather rounded profile.

Notable tortricids include the codling moth and the spruce budworm, which are among the most well-studied of all insects because of their economic impact.

== Description ==
Tortricid moths are generally small, with a wingspan of 3 cm or less. Many species are drab and have mottled and marbled brown colors, but some diurnal species are brightly colored and mimic other moths of the families Geometridae and Pyralidae.

== Life cycle and behavior ==
Tortricid eggs are often flattened and scale-like.

Larvae in the subfamilies Chlidanotinae and Olethreutinae usually feed by boring into stems, roots, buds or seeds. Larvae in the subfamily Tortricinae, however, feed externally and construct leaf rolls. Larvae in the subfamily Tortricinae tend to be more polyphagous than those in Chlidanotinae and Olethreutinae. Tortricinae also possess an anal fork for flicking excrement away from their shelters.

== Some common tortricids ==
The tortricids include many economically important pests, including:

- Summer fruit tortrix moth (Adoxophyes orana)
- Fruit tree tortrix moth (Archips podana)
- Rose leaf roller (Archips rosana)
- Argyrotaenia ljungiana, a pest on vines, maize, and fruit trees
- Peach moth (Cydia molesta)
- Codling moth (Cydia pomonella)
- Plum fruit moth (Cydia funebrana)
- Pea moth (Cydia nigricana)
- Chestnut and acorn moth (Cydia splendana)
- Light brown apple moth (Epiphyas postvittana)
- Hemp borer (Grapholita delineana)
- Oriental fruit moth (Grapholita molesta)
- Cherry fruitworm (Grapholita packardi)
- European grapevine moth (Lobesia botrana)
- Barred fruit tree tortrix moth (Pandemis cerasana)
- Grape berry moth (Paralobesia viteana)
- Long-palped tortrix or vine leaf roller (Sparganothis pilleriana)
- Bud moth (Spilonota ocellana)
- False codling moth (Thaumatotibia (Cryptophlebia) leucotreta)
- Spruce budworm (Genus Choristoneura)

See also Mexican jumping bean moth (Cydia saltitans)

=== A typical tortricid – the codling moth ===
The Tortricidae are considered to be the single most important family of insects that feed on apples, both economically and in diversity of feeding found on fruit, buds, leaves, and shoots. In New York, no fewer than seventeen species of Tortricidae have gained pest status in regards to apple production.

The codling moth Cydia pomonella causes worm-holes in apples. It has been accidentally spread from its original range in Europe and is now found in North and South America, South Africa, Australia, and New Zealand, wherever apples are grown. Control has required the use of the harshest available insecticides – historically lead arsenate and DDT were used for control. These chemicals brought considerable environmental dangers, and in any case the insect gradually developed resistance to them. Currently, organophosphate sprays are favored and are timed carefully to catch the hatching larvae before they can bore into the fruit.

== Gallery ==
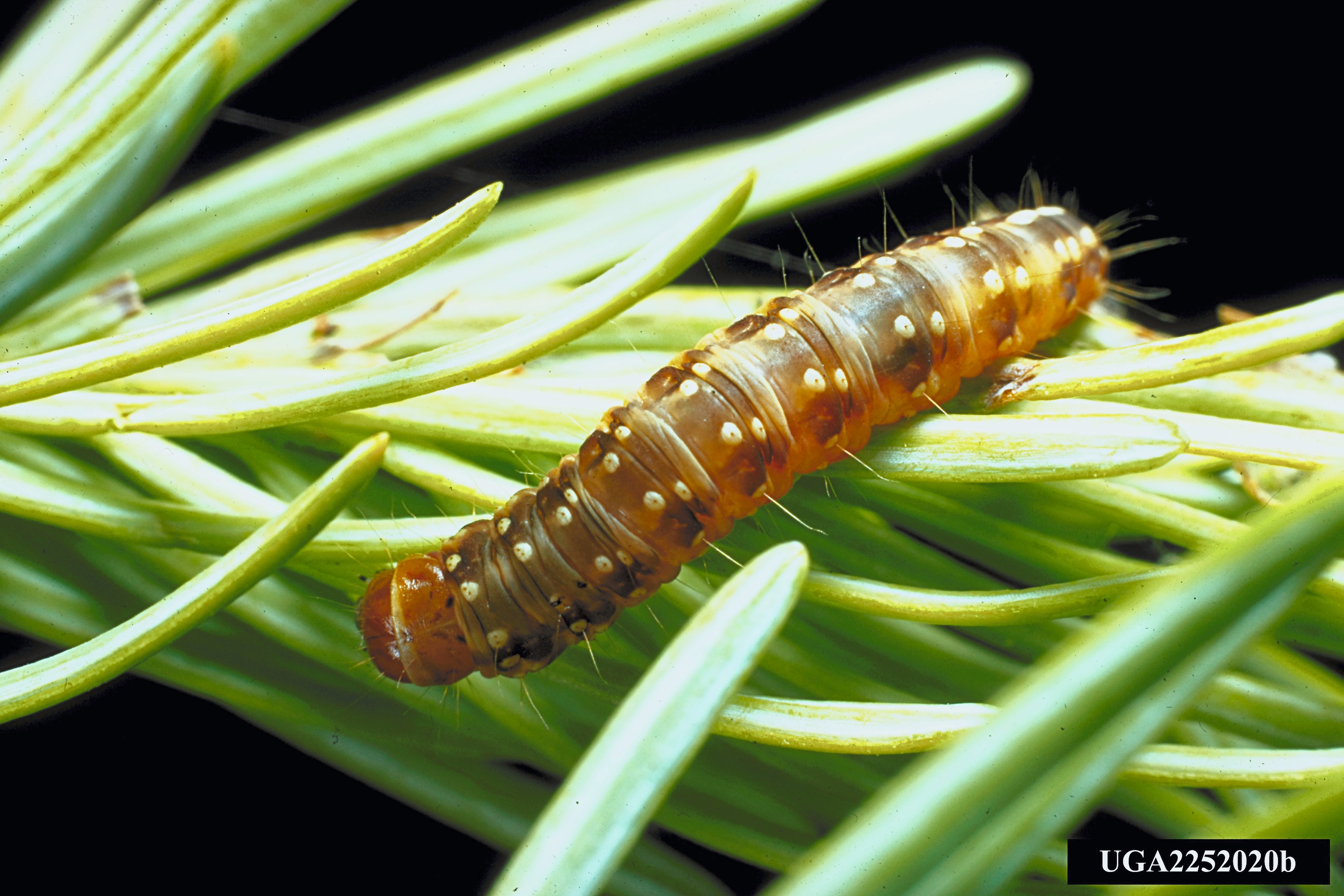
Choristoneura fumiferana larva

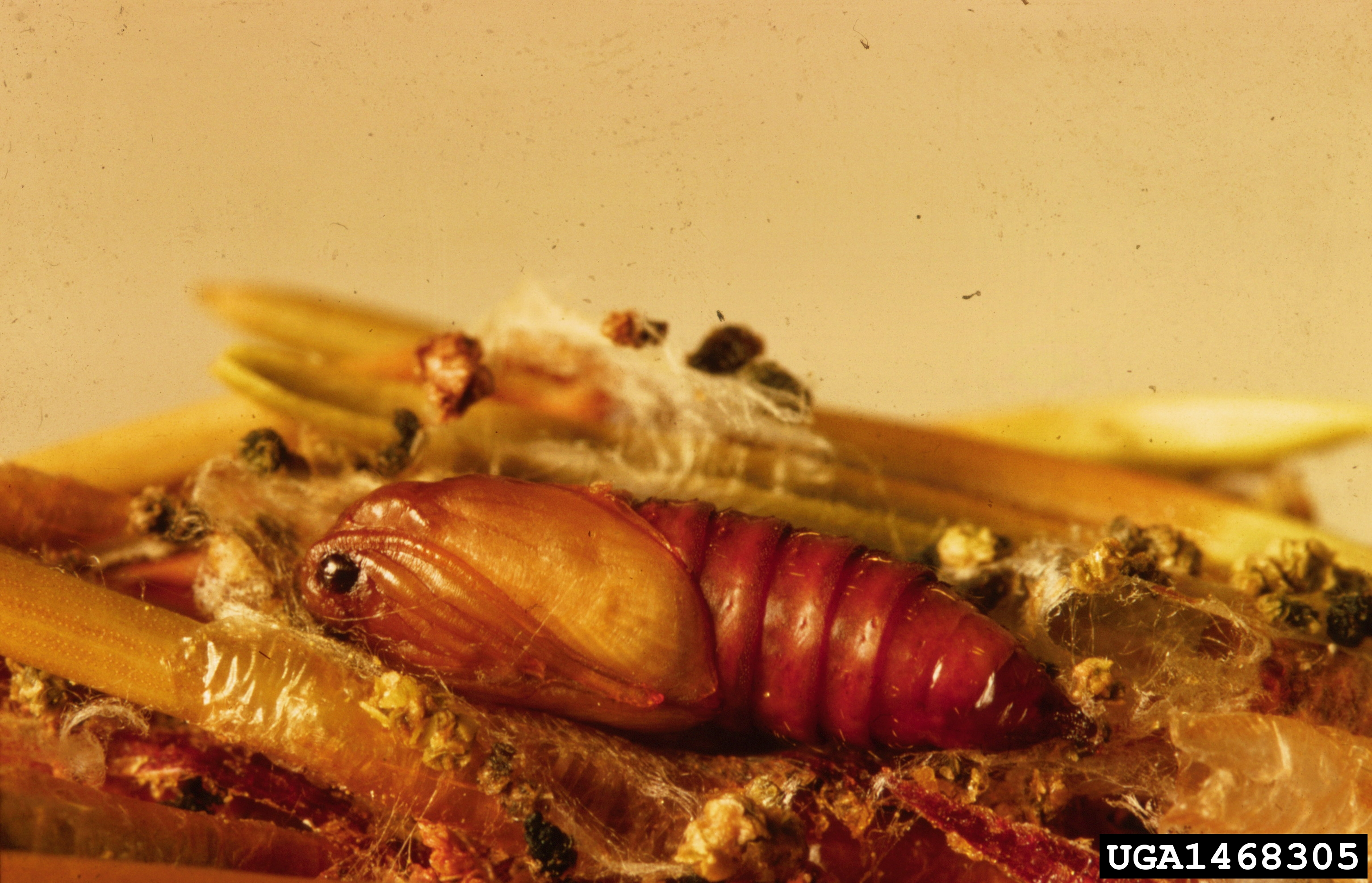
Choristoneura lambertiana pupa

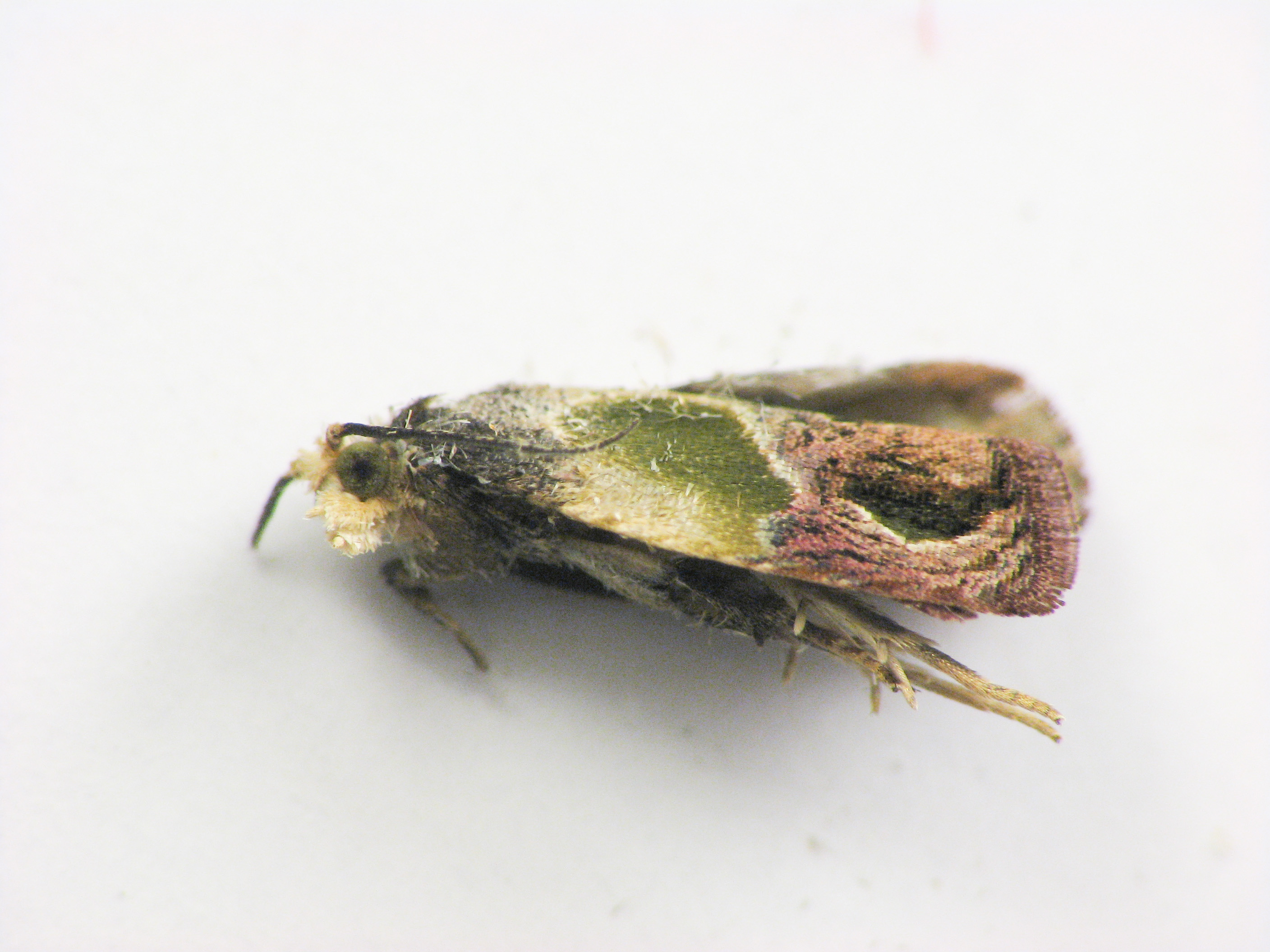
Eumarozia malachitana

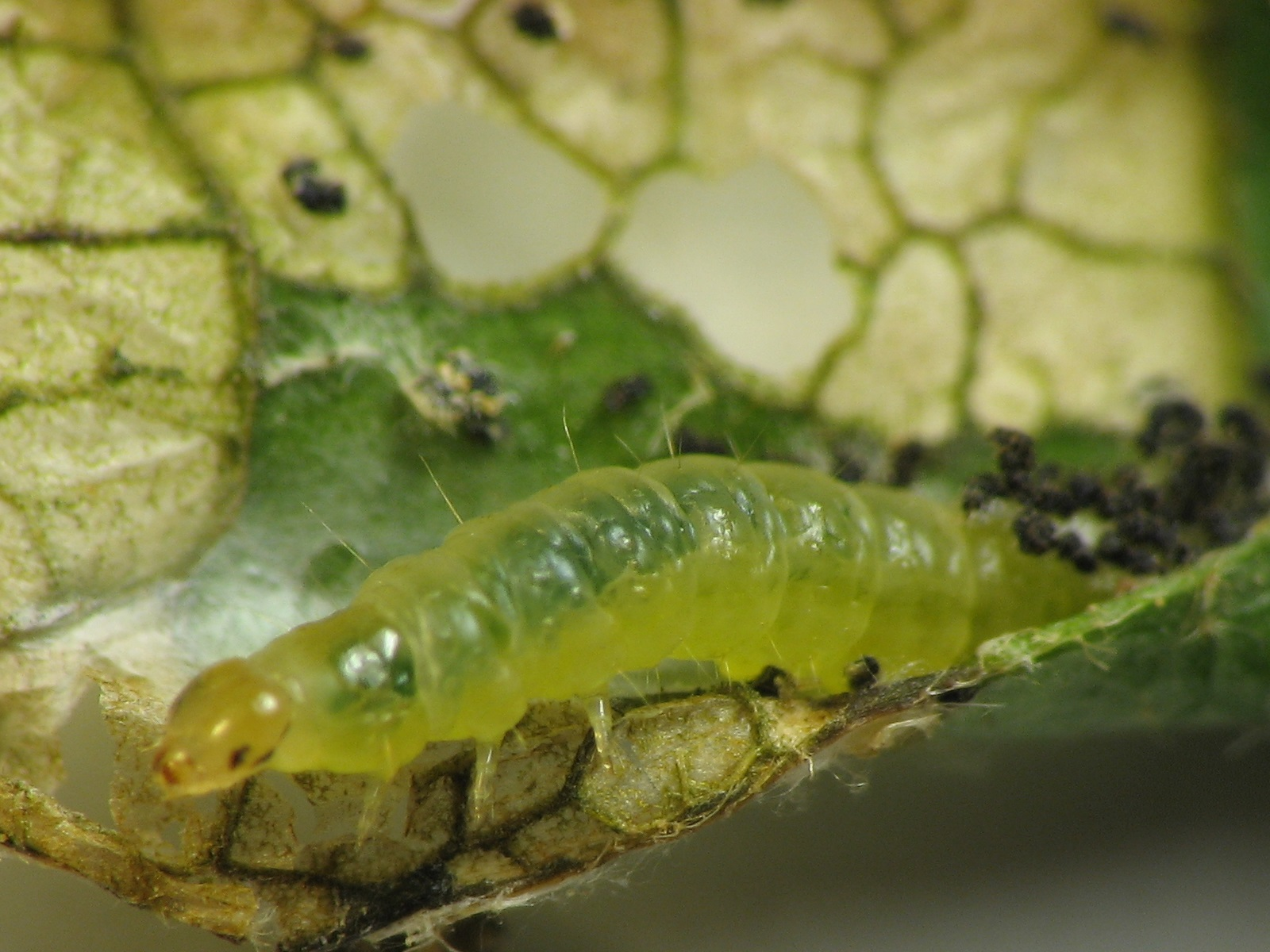
Pandemis limitata larva

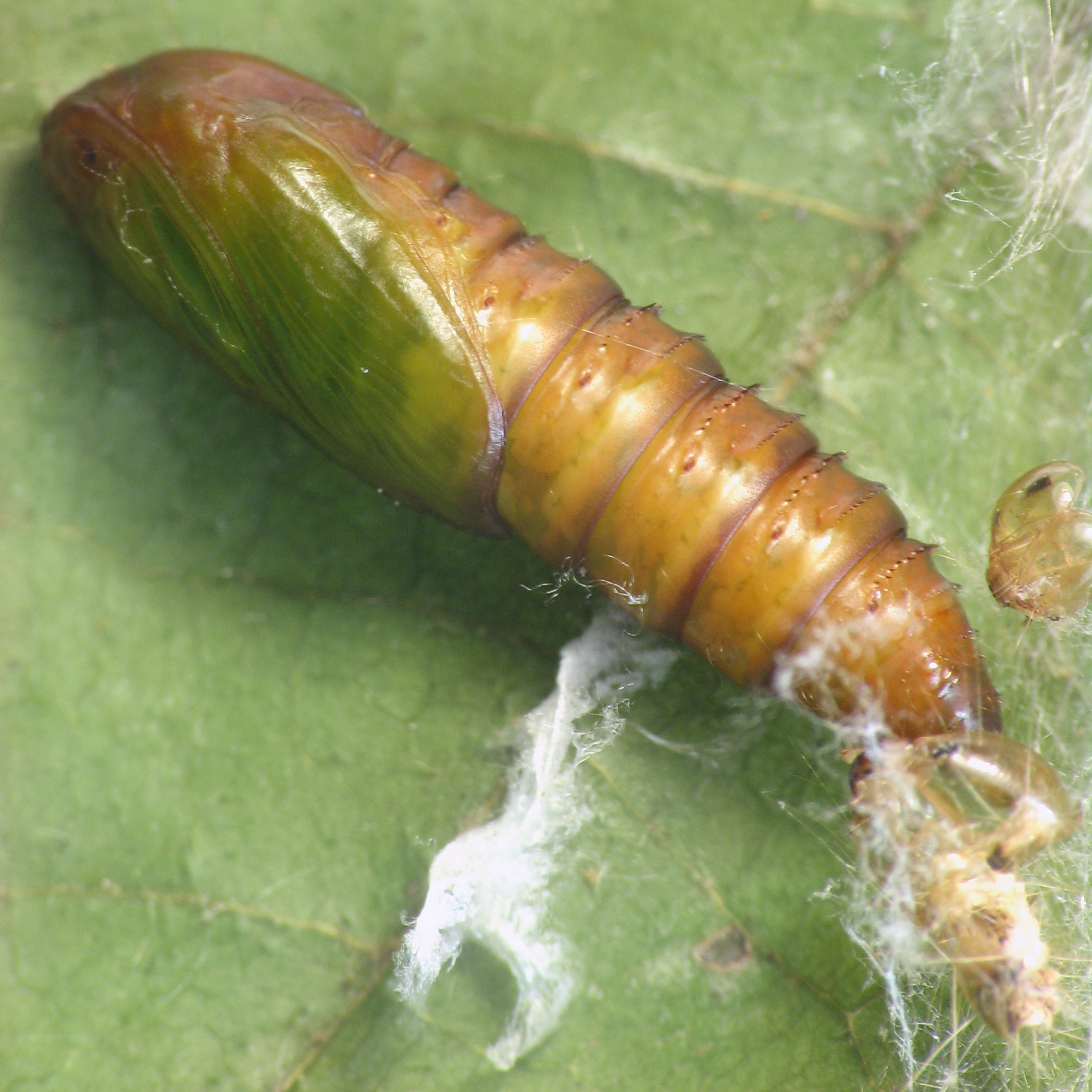
Pandemis limitata pupa

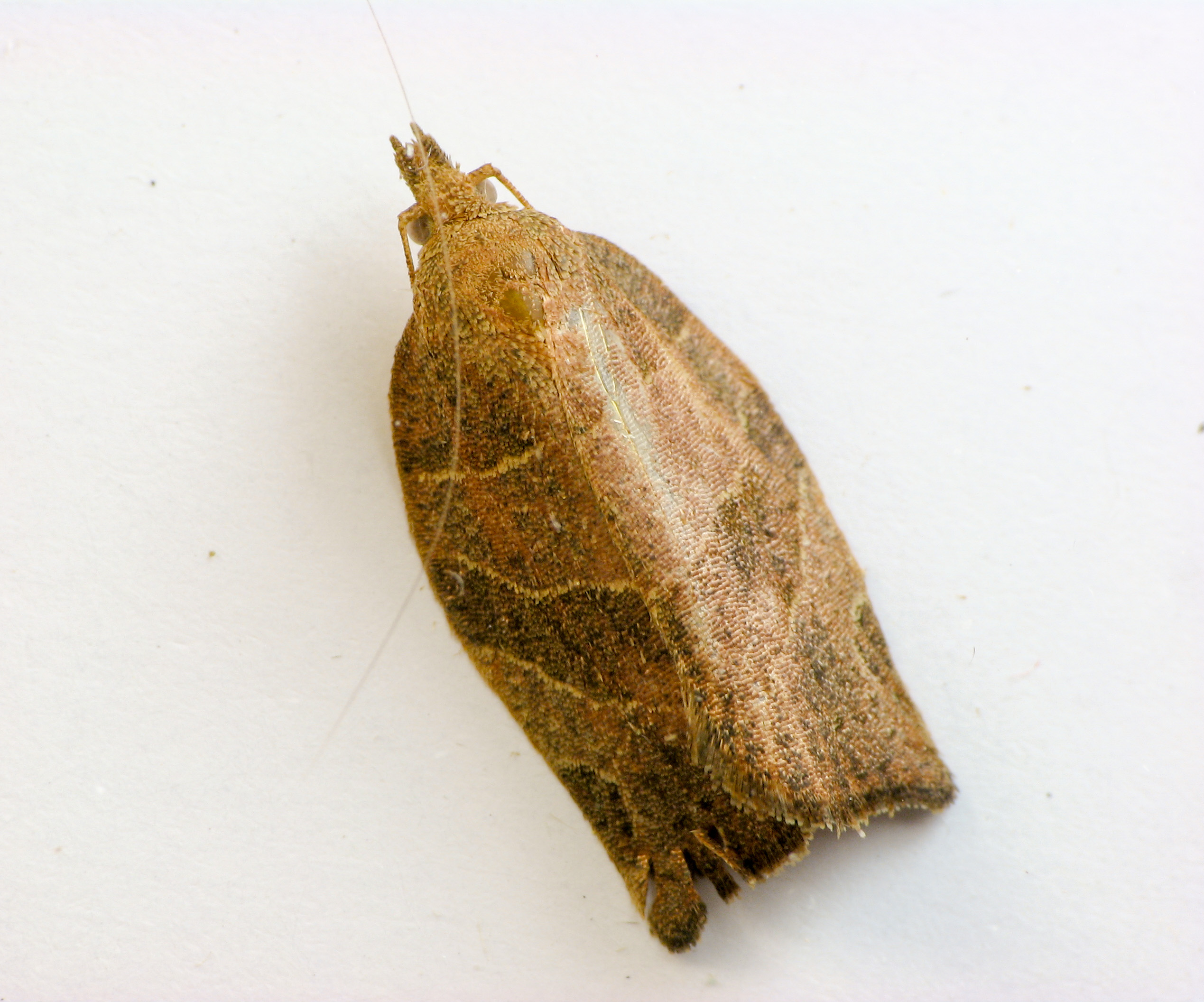
Pandemis limitata adult

== See also ==
- List of Tortricidae genera
