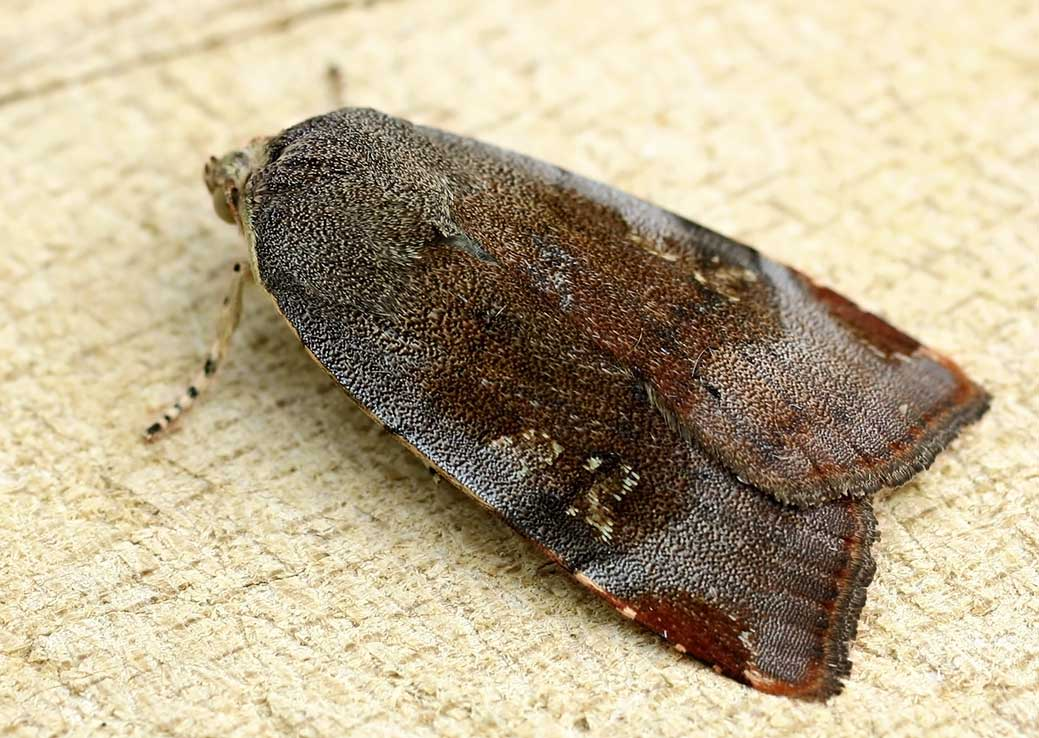
- Noctua janthe

Scientific classification
- Kingdom: Animalia
- Phylum: Arthropoda
- Clade: Pancrustacea
- Class: Insecta
- Order: Lepidoptera
- Superfamily: Noctuoidea
- Family: Noctuidae
- Tribe: Noctuini
- Genus: Noctua; Linnaeus, 1758

Type species
- Phalaena pronuba Linnaeus, 1758

Synonyms
- Euschesis Hübner, 1821; Lampra Hübner; Noctuella Rafinesque, 1815; Nyctemia Rafinesque, 1815; Triphaena Ochsenheimer, 1816; Tryphaena Meigen, 1831; Xanthoptera Sodoffsky, 1837

= Noctua (moth) =

Genus of moths

Noctua (Latin for "little owl") is a genus of moths. They have dull, cryptic forewings and often very bright hindwings. These are hidden under the forewings when the moths rest, leading to their common name of yellow underwings. They are not particularly closely related to the "true" underwing moths (Catocala) though, apart from both being Noctuoidea (and in the traditional classification, Noctuidae).

== Species ==
- Noctua atlantica (Warren, 1905
- Noctua carvalhoi Pinker, 1983
- Noctua comes – lesser yellow underwing Hübner, [1813]
- Noctua fimbriata – broad-bordered yellow underwing Schreber, 1759
- Noctua interjecta – least yellow underwing Hübner, [1803]
- Noctua interposita Hübner, [1790]
- Noctua janthe – lesser broad-bordered yellow underwing Borkhausen, 1792
- Noctua janthina – Langmaid's yellow underwing Denis & Schiffermüller, 1775
- Noctua noacki Boursin, 1957
- Noctua orbona – lunar yellow underwing Hufnagel, 1766
- Noctua pronuba – large yellow underwing (Linnaeus, 1758)
- Noctua teixeirai Pinker, 1971
- Noctua tertia Mentzer, Moberg & Fibiger, 1991
- Noctua tirrenica Biebinger, Speidel & Hanigk, 1983
- Noctua undosa Leech, 1889
- Noctua warreni Lödl, 1987

== Noctua comparison ==
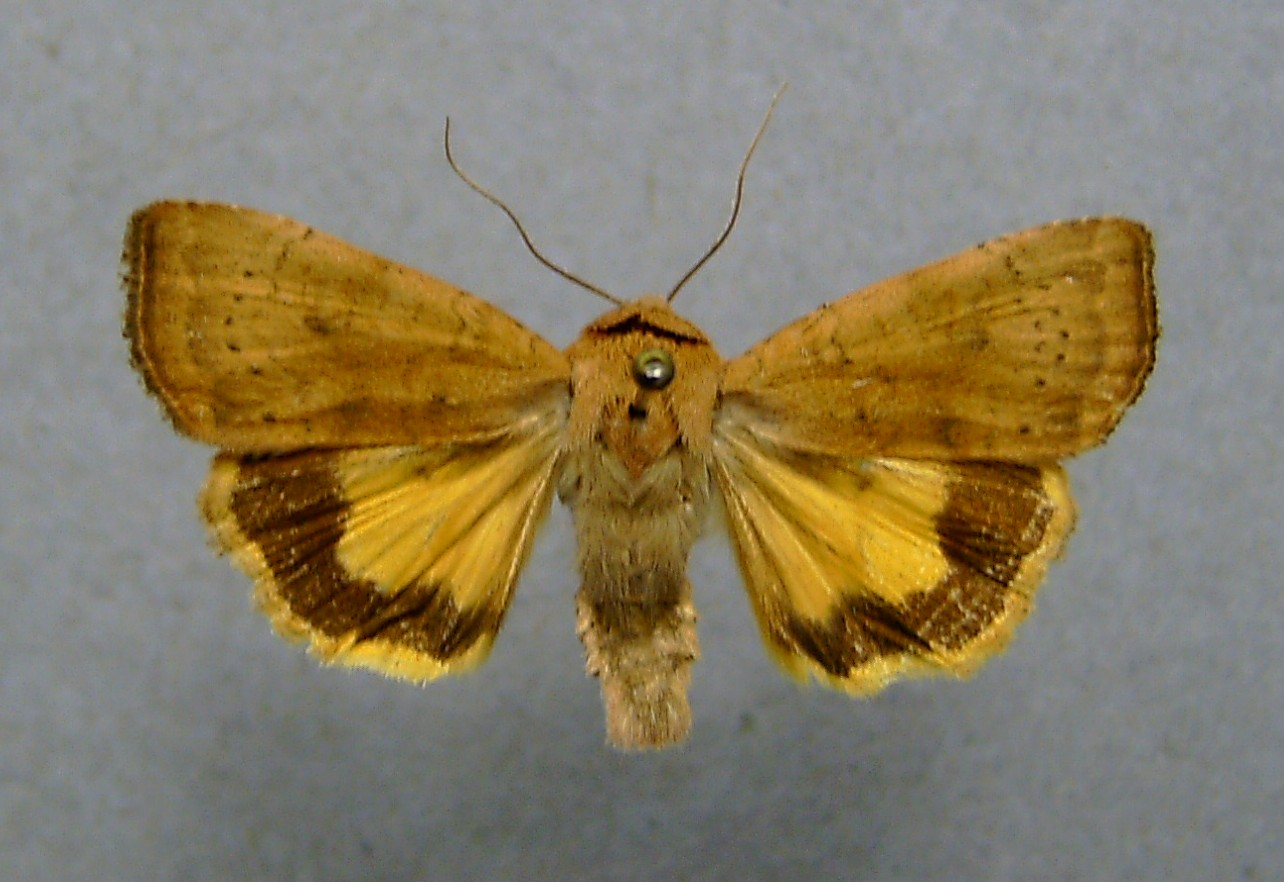
Noctua interjecta

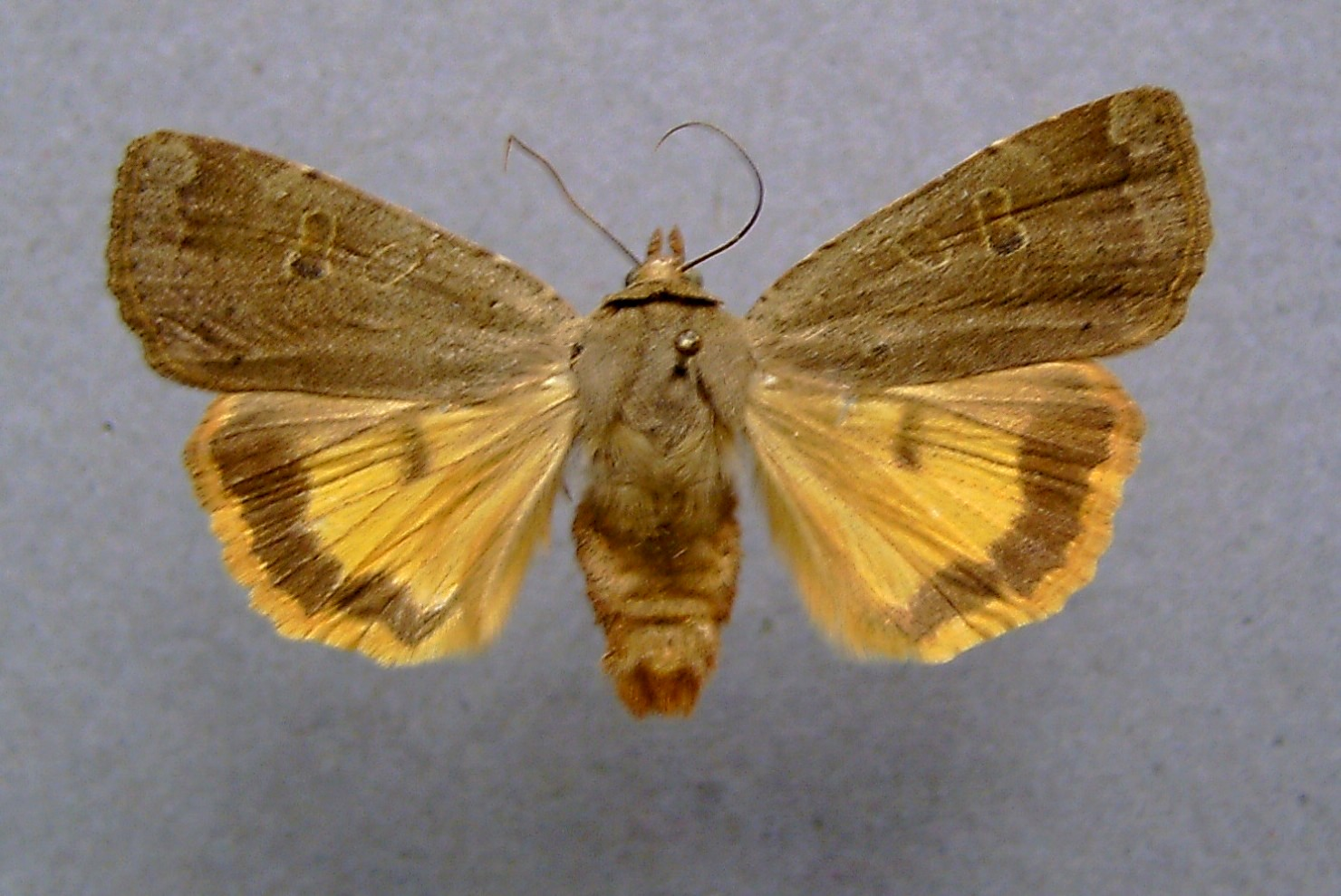
Noctua comes

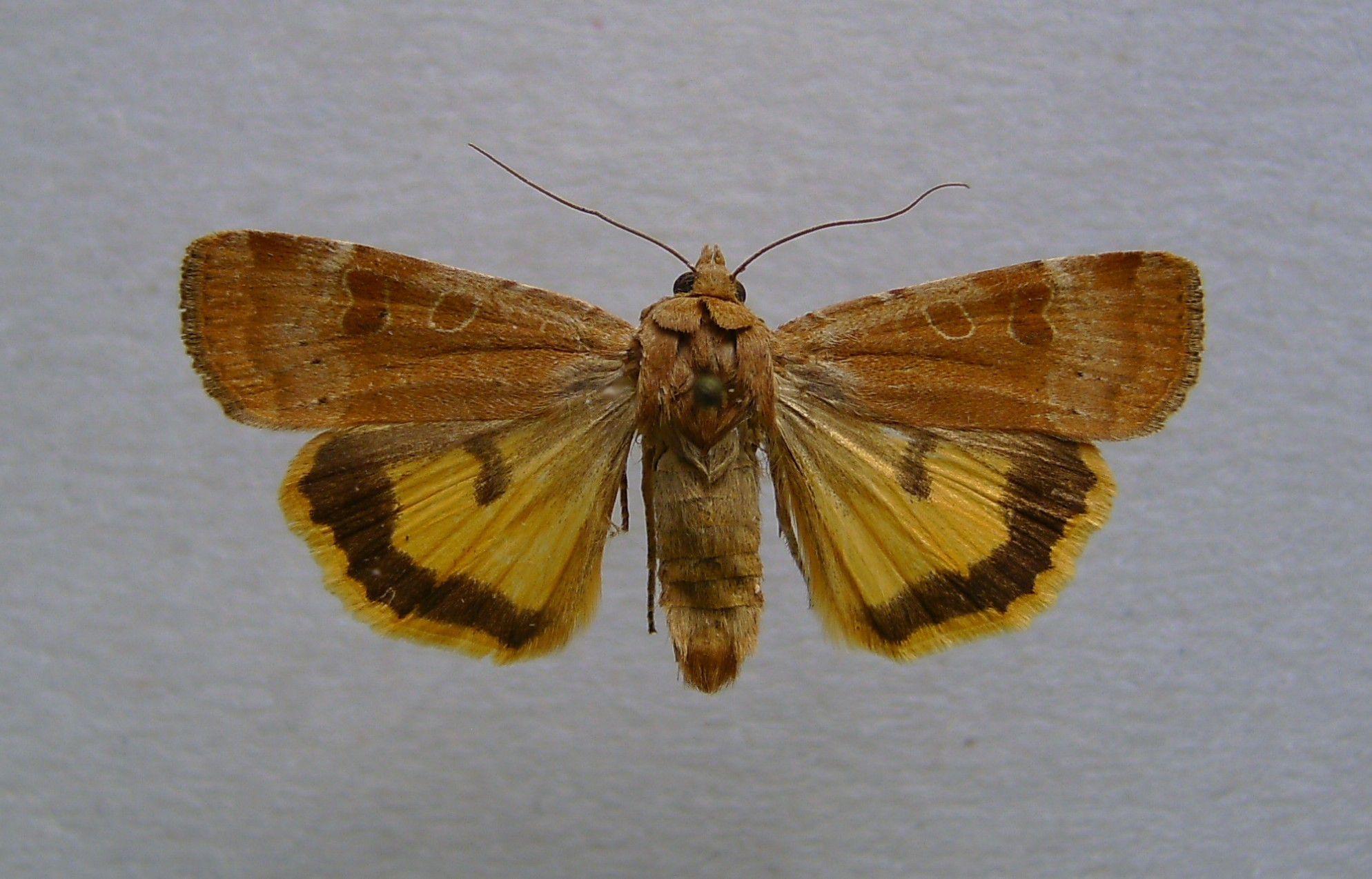
Noctua interposita

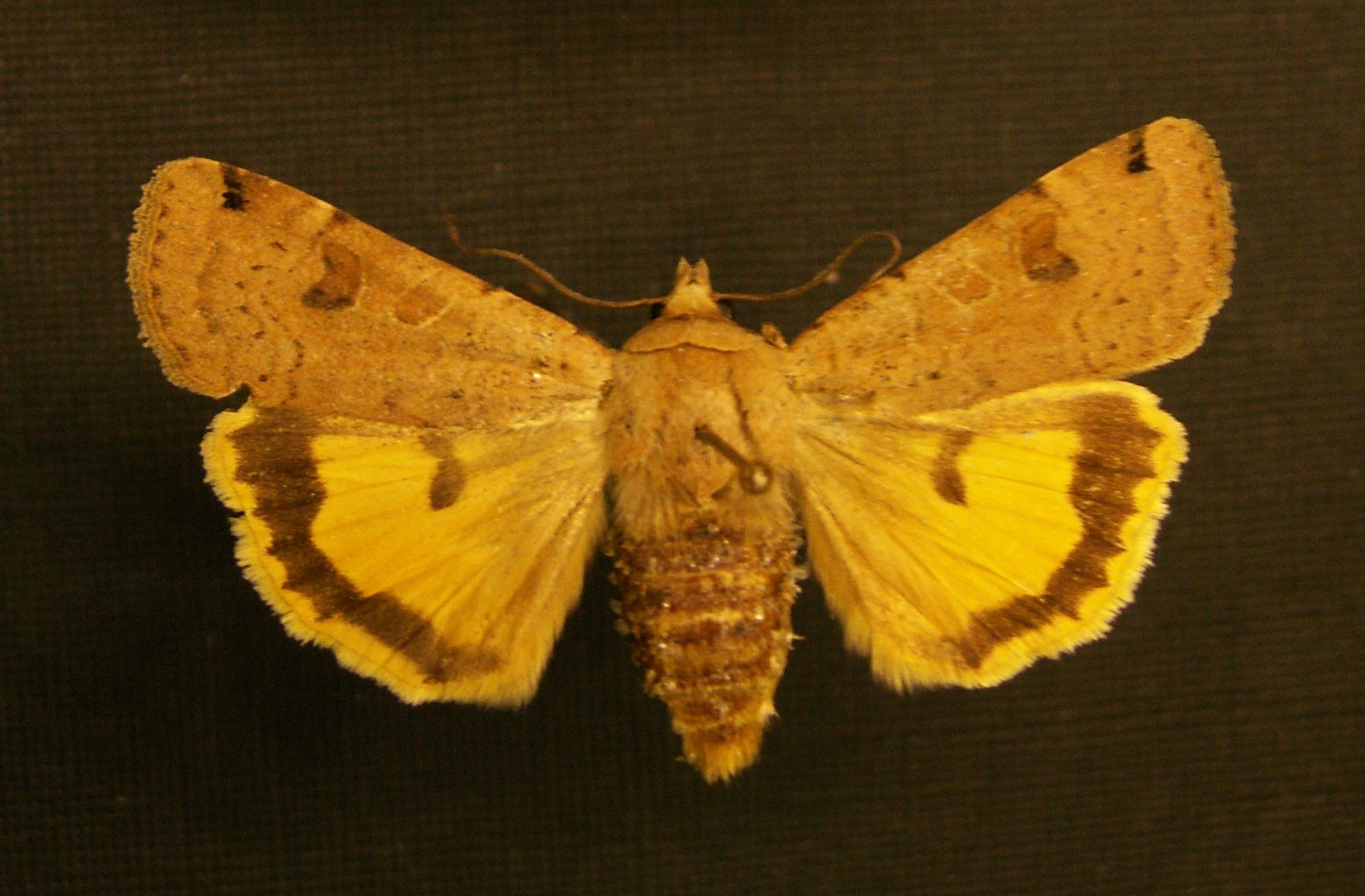
Noctua orbona

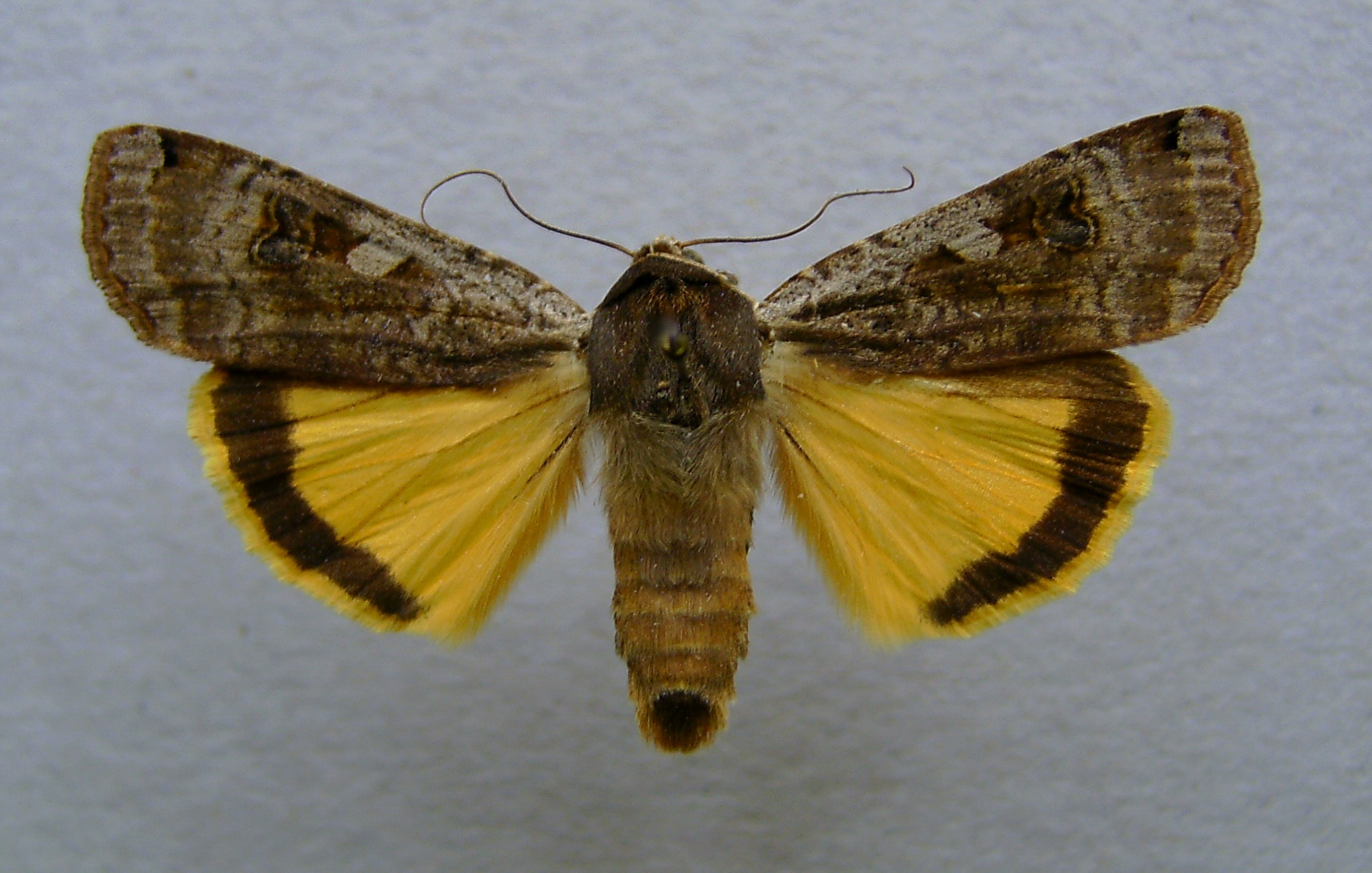
Noctua pronuba

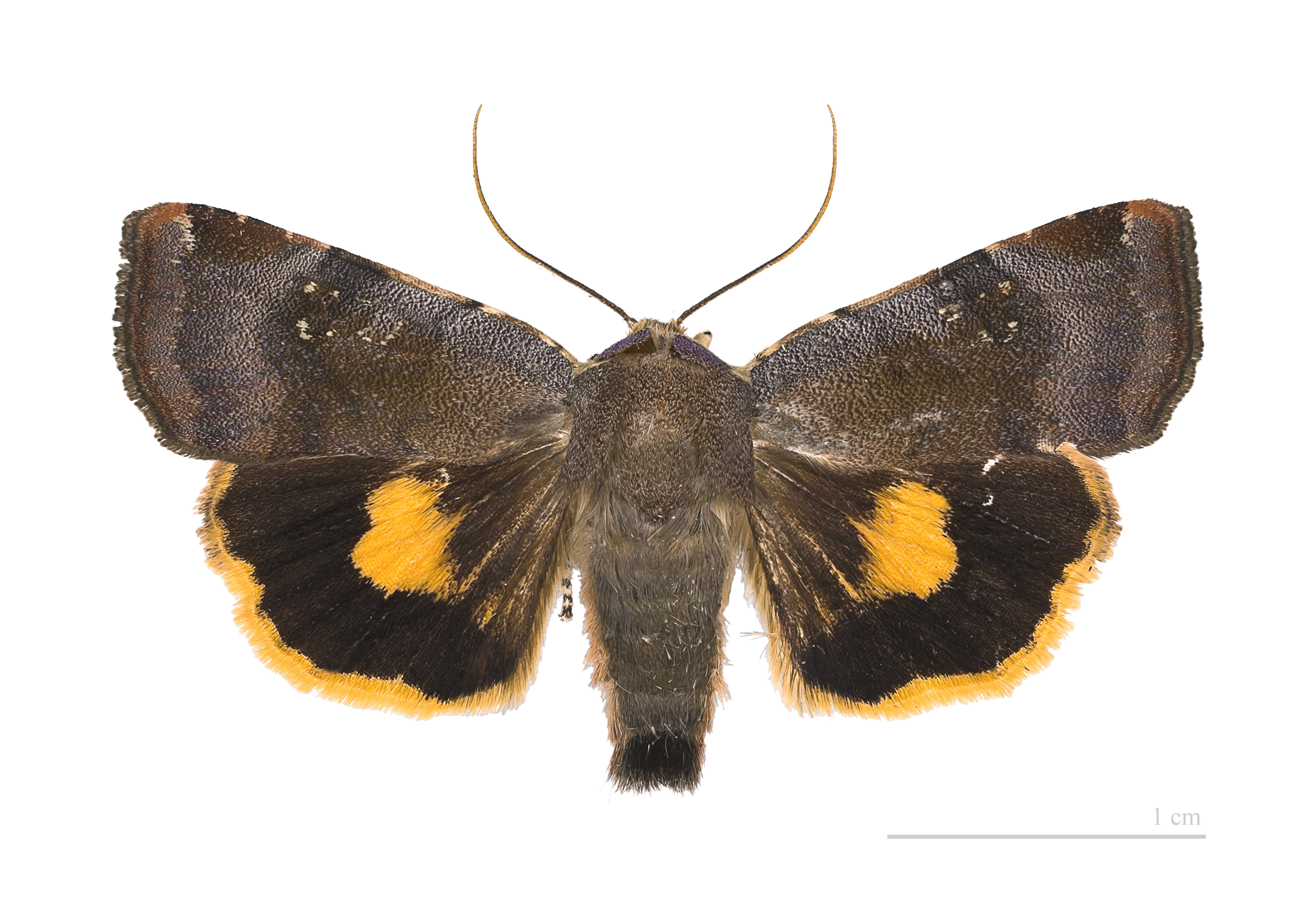
Noctua janthina

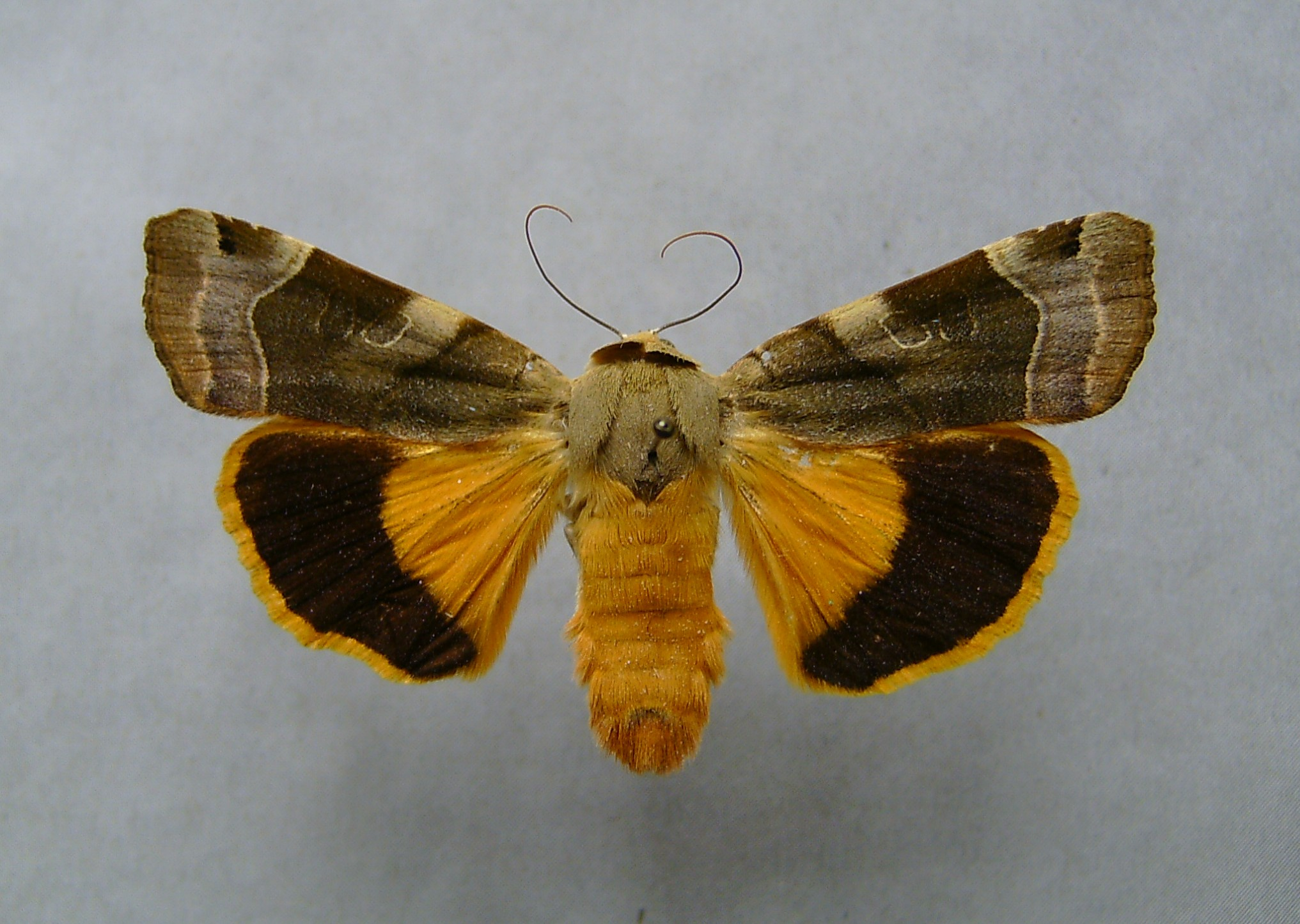
Noctua fimbriata

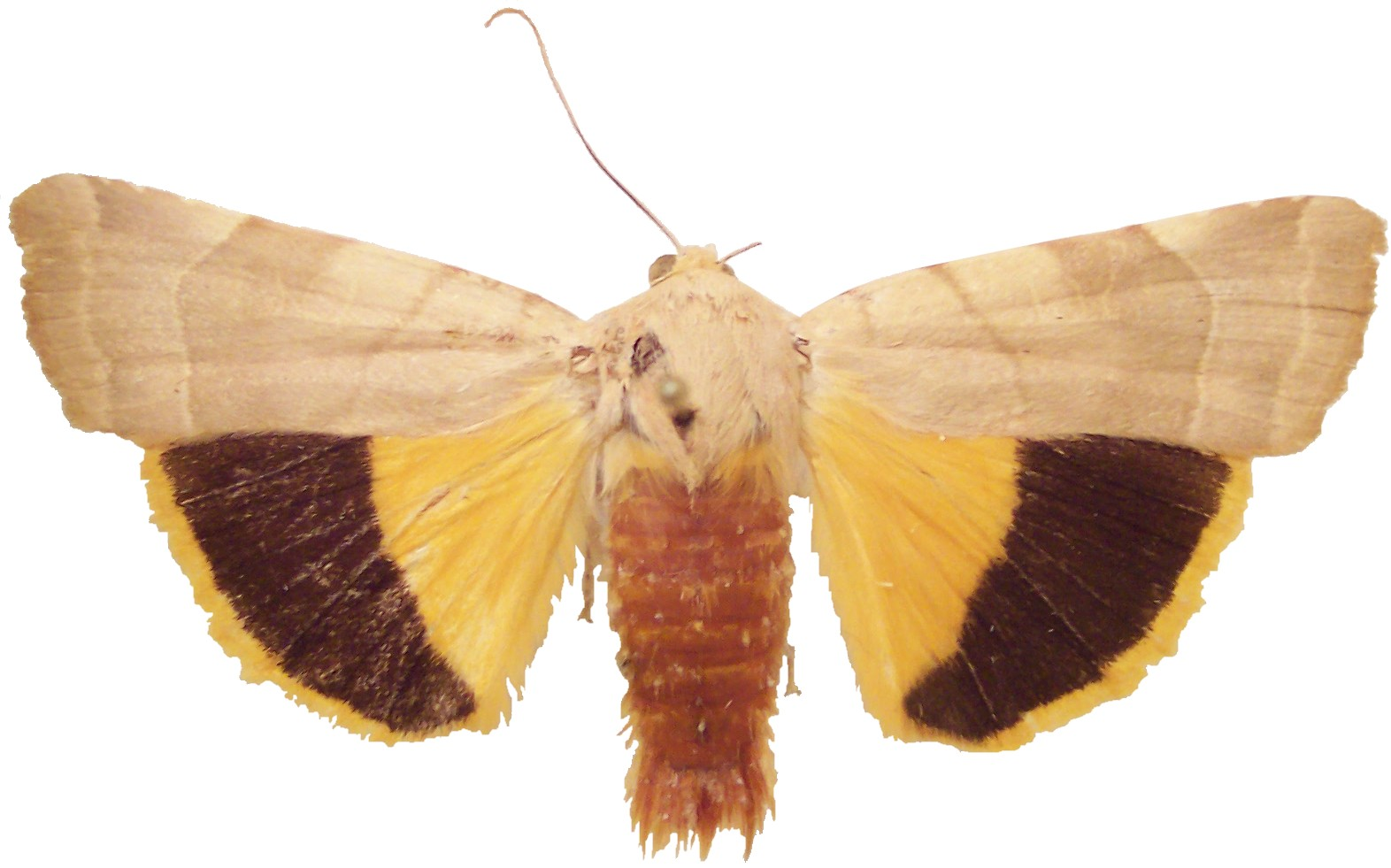
Noctua tirrenica

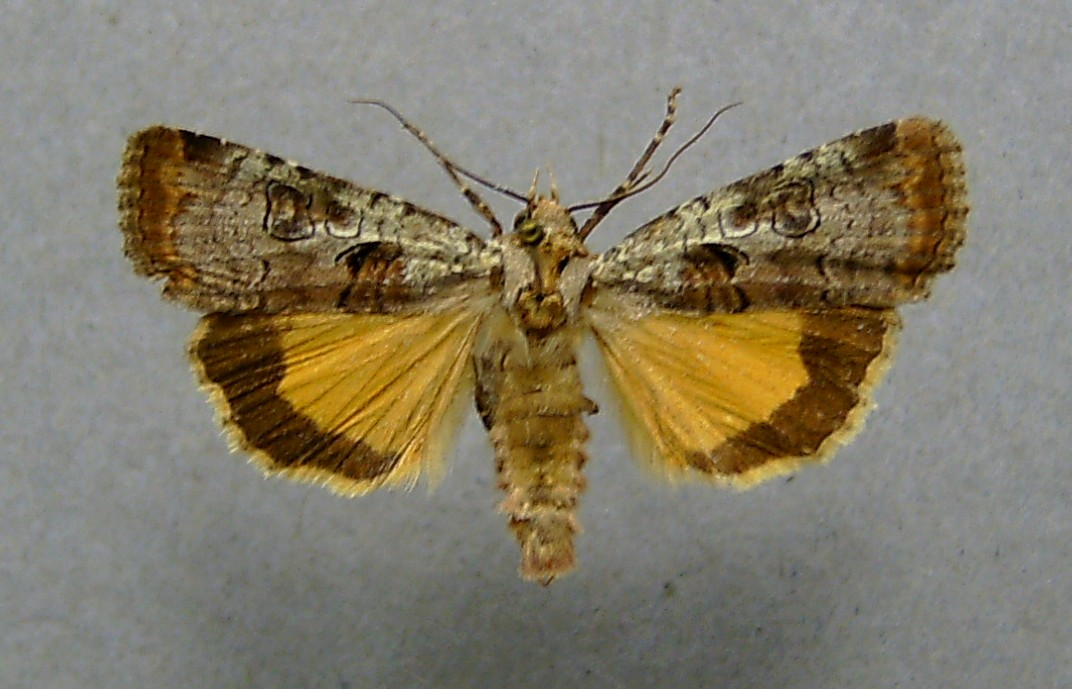
Epilecta linogrisea
