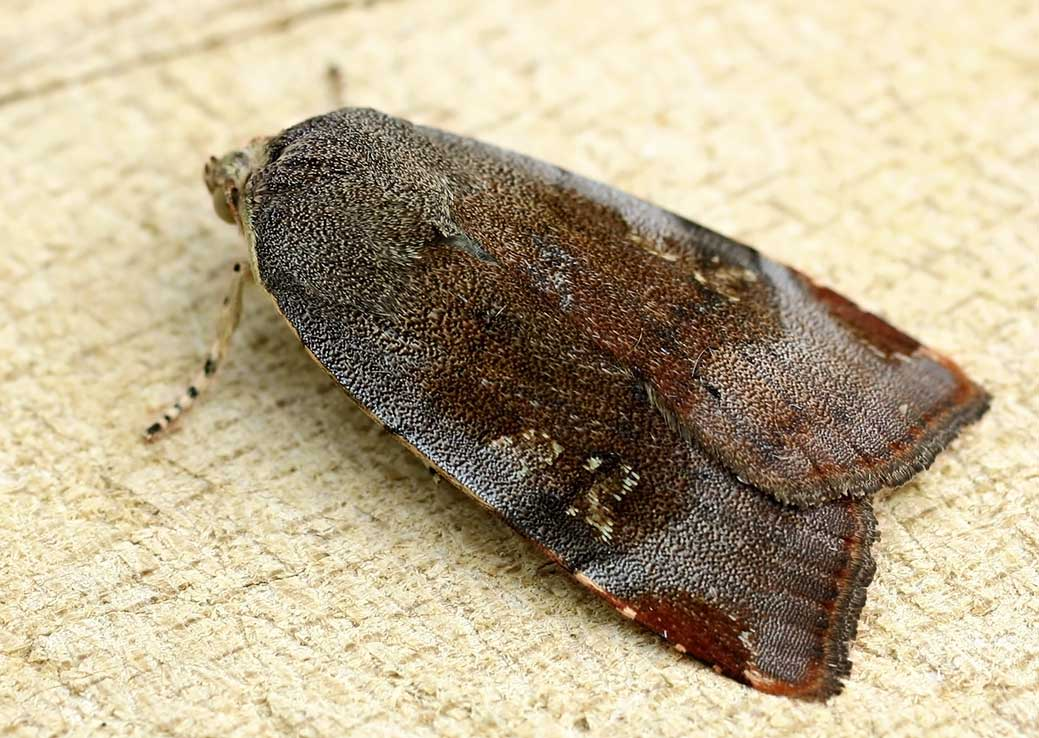

Conservation status
- Least Concern (IUCN 3.1)

Scientific classification
- Kingdom: Animalia
- Phylum: Arthropoda
- Clade: Pancrustacea
- Class: Insecta
- Order: Lepidoptera
- Superfamily: Noctuoidea
- Family: Noctuidae
- Genus: Noctua
- Species: N. janthe

Binomial name
- Noctua janthe Borkhausen, 1792

= Noctua janthe =

Lesser broad-bordered yellow underwing

Species of moth

Noctua janthe, the lesser broad-bordered yellow underwing, is a moth of the family Noctuidae. Some authors consider Noctua janthe and Noctua janthina to be the same species. It is found in Europe and North Africa.

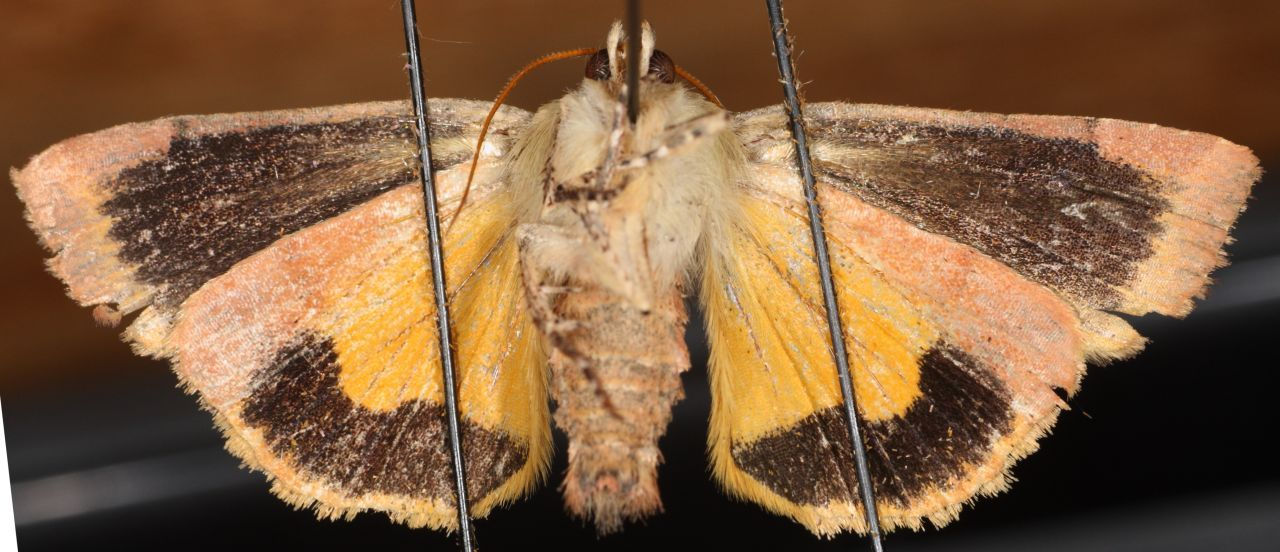
Big contrast under front wings

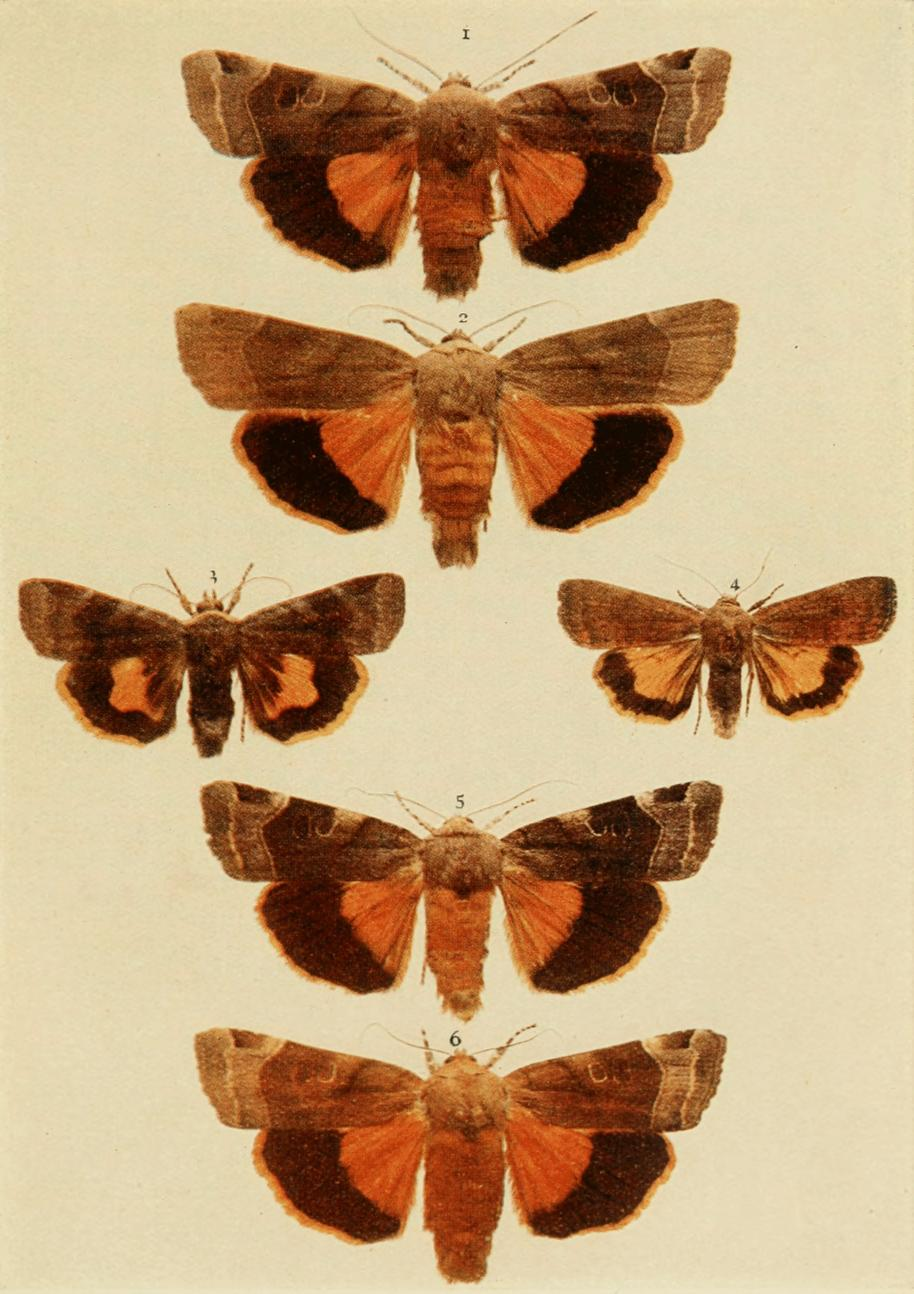
Comparison of 1, 2, 5, 6. broad-bordered yellow underwing Noctua fimbriata 3. lesser broad-bordered yellow underwing Noctua janthe 4. least yellow underwing Noctua interjecta

The wingspan is 30–40 mm (1.2–1.6 in). The length of the forewings is 16–20 mm (0.63–0.79 in). The ground colour of the forewings varies from bright ochre to gray to brown, often with a reddish or light purple tint. Orbicular and reniform are not clearly marked. The hindwing is orange-yellow with a broad distal black band. This species can only be separated from Noctua janthina by examination of the genitalia. See Townsend et al.

The moth flies in one generation from late June to September. The larvae feed on various deciduous trees, shrubs and herbaceous plants.

== Notes ==
1. The flight season refers to Belgium and The Netherlands. This may vary in other parts of the range.
