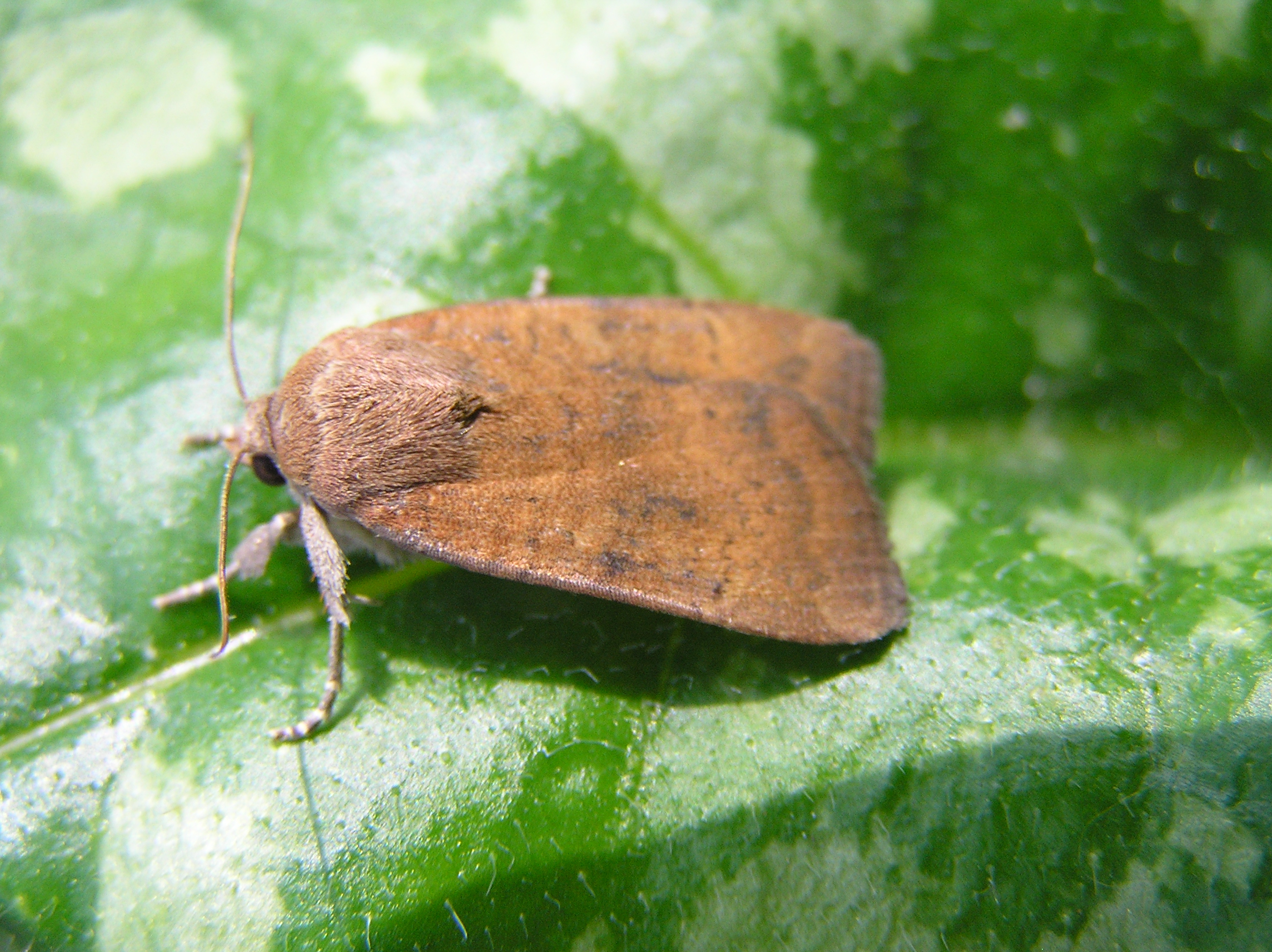

Scientific classification
- Kingdom: Animalia
- Phylum: Arthropoda
- Class: Insecta
- Order: Lepidoptera
- Superfamily: Noctuoidea
- Family: Noctuidae
- Genus: Noctua
- Species: N. interjecta

Binomial name
- Noctua interjecta Hübner, 1803

= Noctua interjecta =

Least yellow underwing

Species of moth

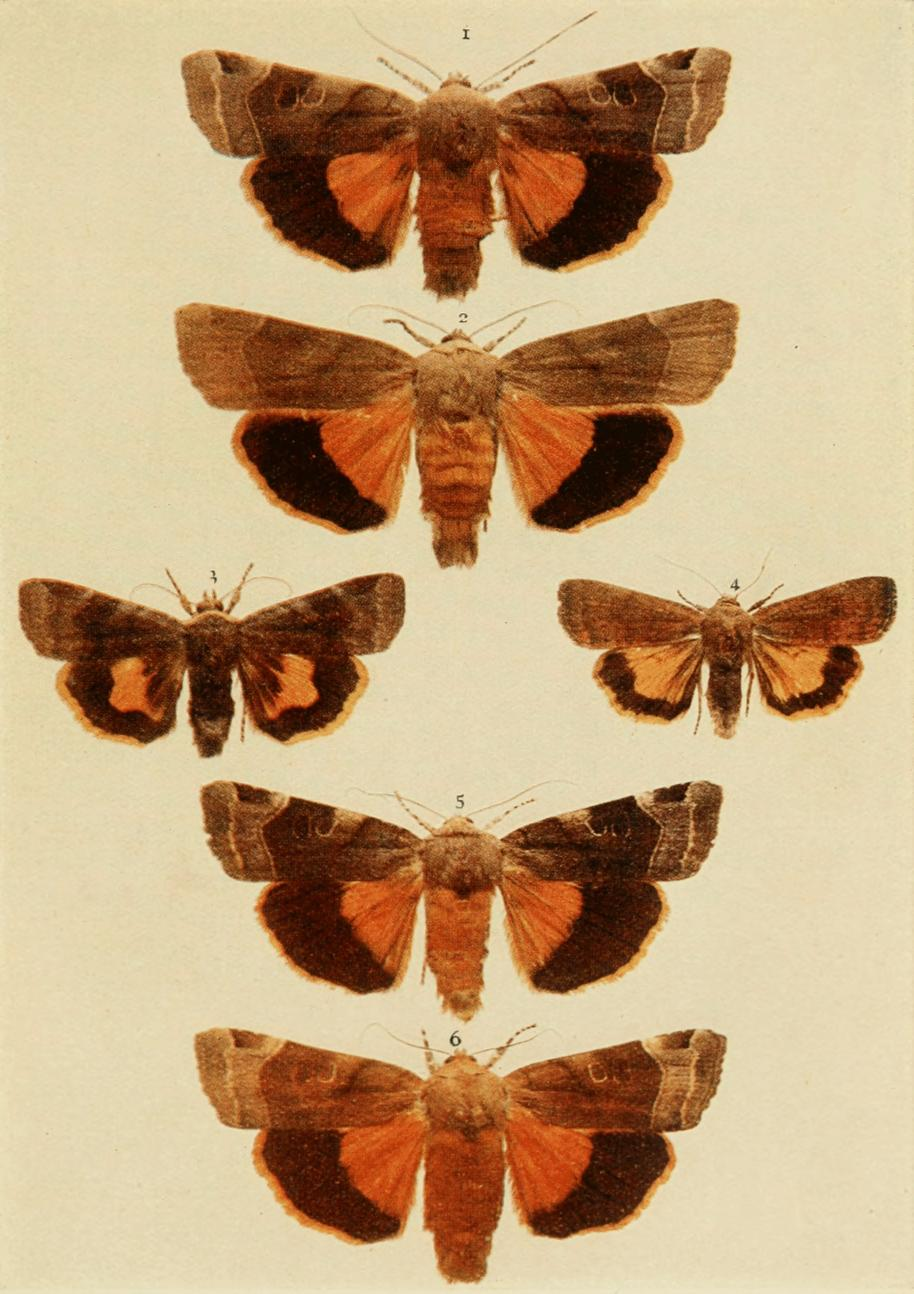
Comparison of 1, 2, 5, 6. broad-bordered yellow underwing (Noctua fimbriata) 3. lesser broad-bordered yellow underwing (Noctua janthe) 4. least yellow underwing (Noctua interjecta)

Noctua interjecta, the least yellow underwing, is a species of moth of the family Noctuidae. It is found in Europe.

== Subspecies ==
There are two subspecies:

- Noctua interjecta interjecta (Alps, southern France, northern and south-eastern Spain, northern Portugal, Italy, Bulgaria, northern Greece and Romania)
- Noctua interjecta caliginosa (Schawerda, 1919) (southern and central England, Wales, southern Ireland, northern France, Belgium, Luxemburg, Netherlands, northern Germany, Denmark, southern Sweden, Czech Republic and Austria)

== Description ==
The wingspan is 31–36 mm. The length of the forewings is 14–17 mm. Forewing greyish rufous, sometimes darkened with fuscous; lines and stigmata a little darker, often very obscure; hindwing orange yellow with a broad marginal black border; costal and inner margins, a submedian streak from base, and the cell blackish; fringe yellow.

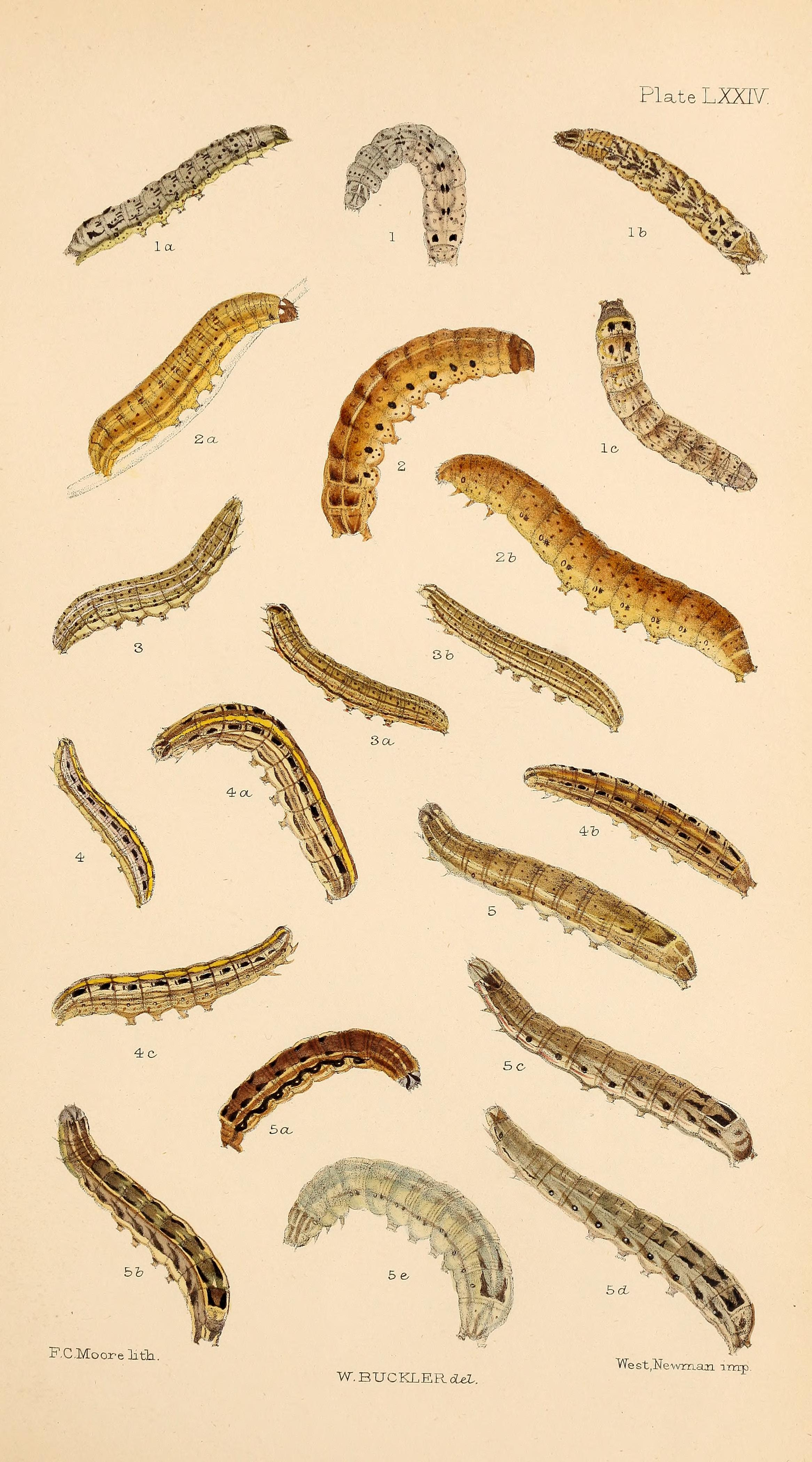
3,3a,3b larva after last moult

The larva is pale ochreous with black dots; the lines pale, with darker edges.

== Biology ==
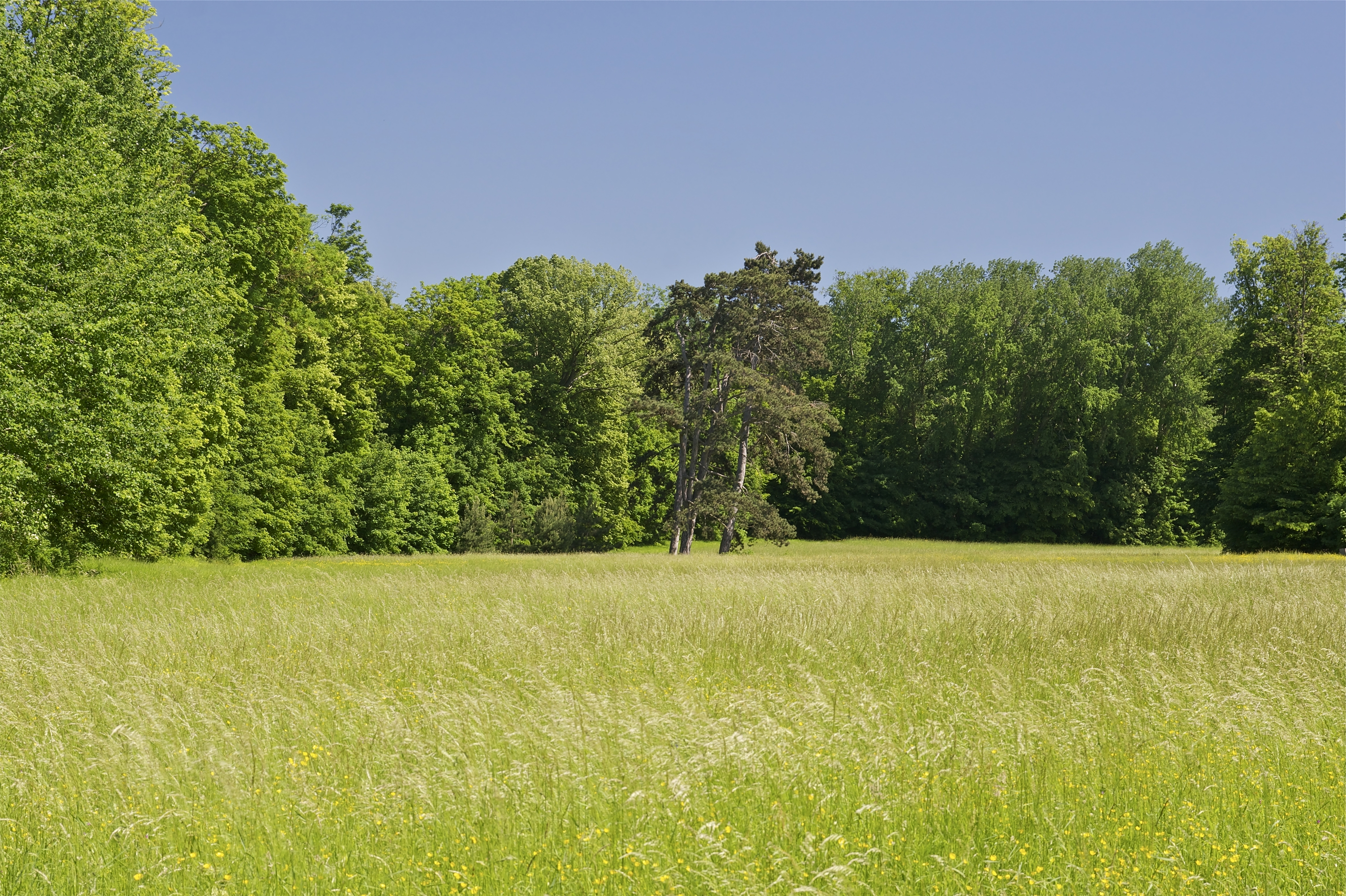
Habitat in France

In Belgium and the Netherlands, this species flies in one generation from late June to August.

The larvae feed on various grasses and herbaceous plants such as meadowsweet (Filipendula ulmaria) and common mallow (Malva sylvestris).
