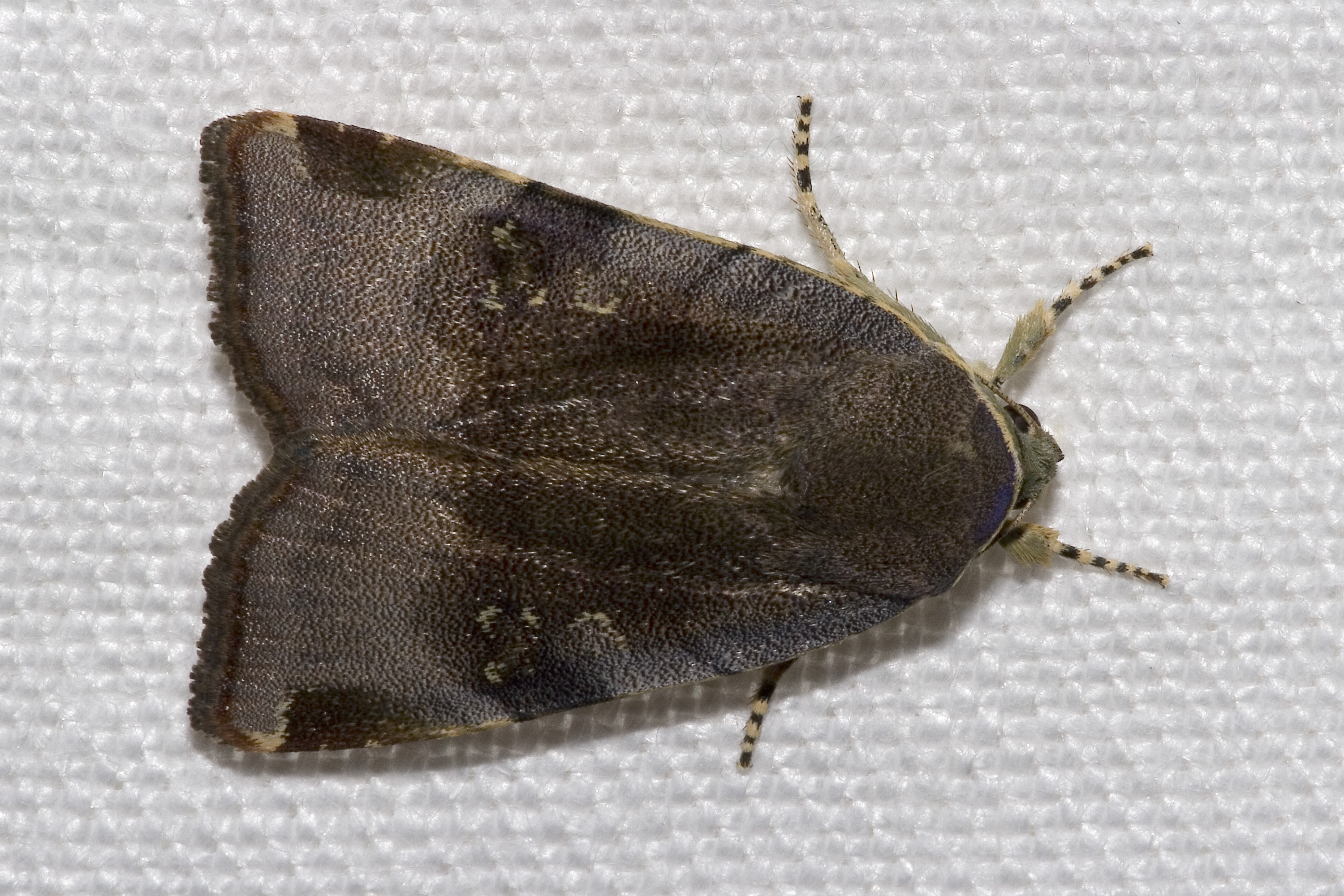

Conservation status
- Least Concern (IUCN 3.1)

Scientific classification
- Kingdom: Animalia
- Phylum: Arthropoda
- Clade: Pancrustacea
- Class: Insecta
- Order: Lepidoptera
- Superfamily: Noctuoidea
- Family: Noctuidae
- Genus: Noctua
- Species: N. janthina

Binomial name
- Noctua janthina Denis & Schiffermüller, 1775

= Lesser broad-bordered yellow underwing =

Species of moth

The lesser broad-bordered yellow underwing or Langmaid's yellow underwing (Noctua janthina) is a moth of the family Noctuidae. It is distributed throughout southern and central Europe, and southern Sweden.

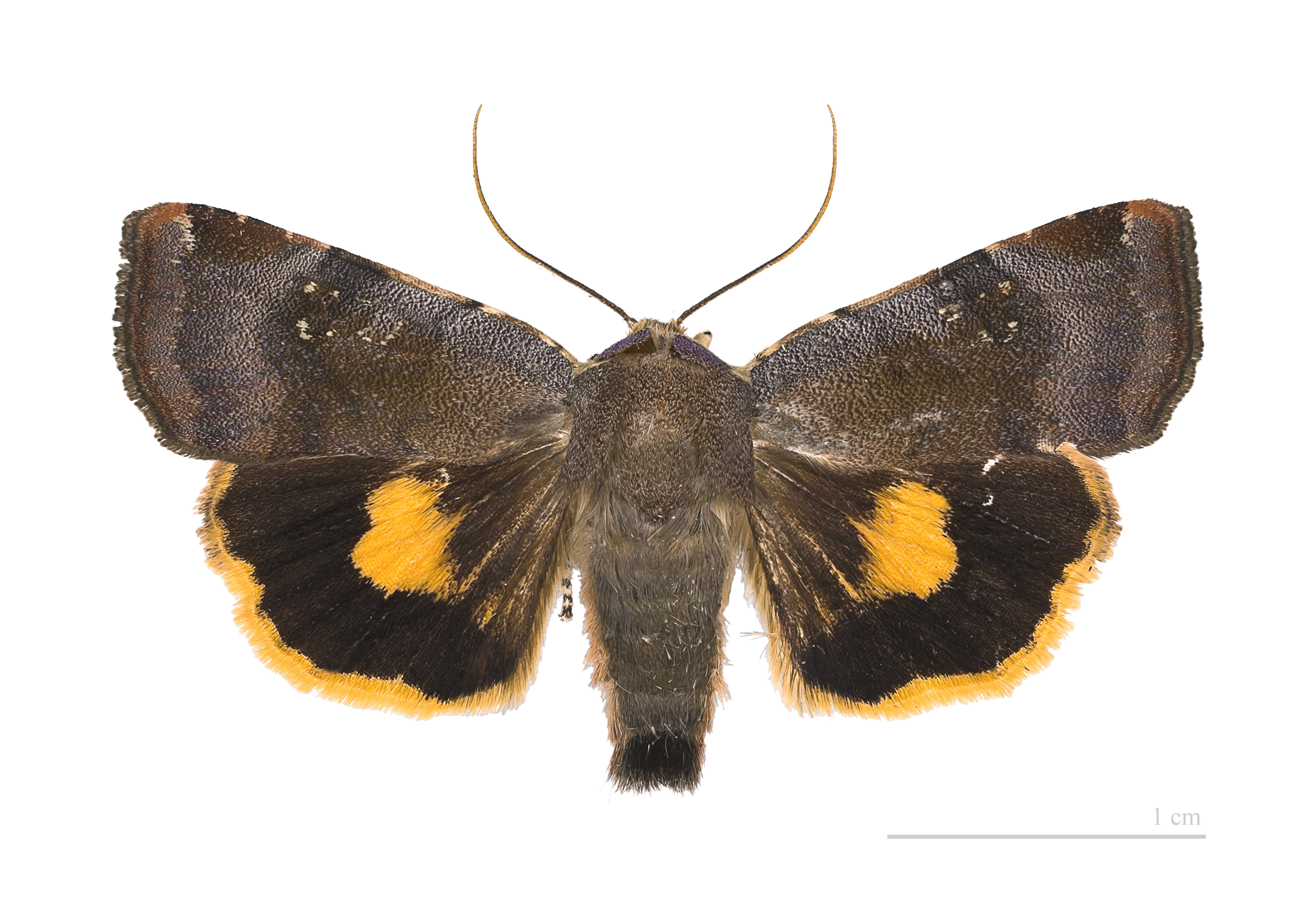
Noctua janthina

Like other members of its genus this species has bright orange-yellow hindwings but as the common name suggests the black sub-terminal bands are very broad and account for about half the area of the hindwings. The forewings are more cryptically marked but are generally more attractively marked than in its congenators, variegated in shades of buff and purplish-brown. The wingspan is 34–44 mm (1.3–1.7 in). This species can only be separated from Noctua janthe and the disputed Noctua tertia by examination of the genitalia. See Townsend et al.

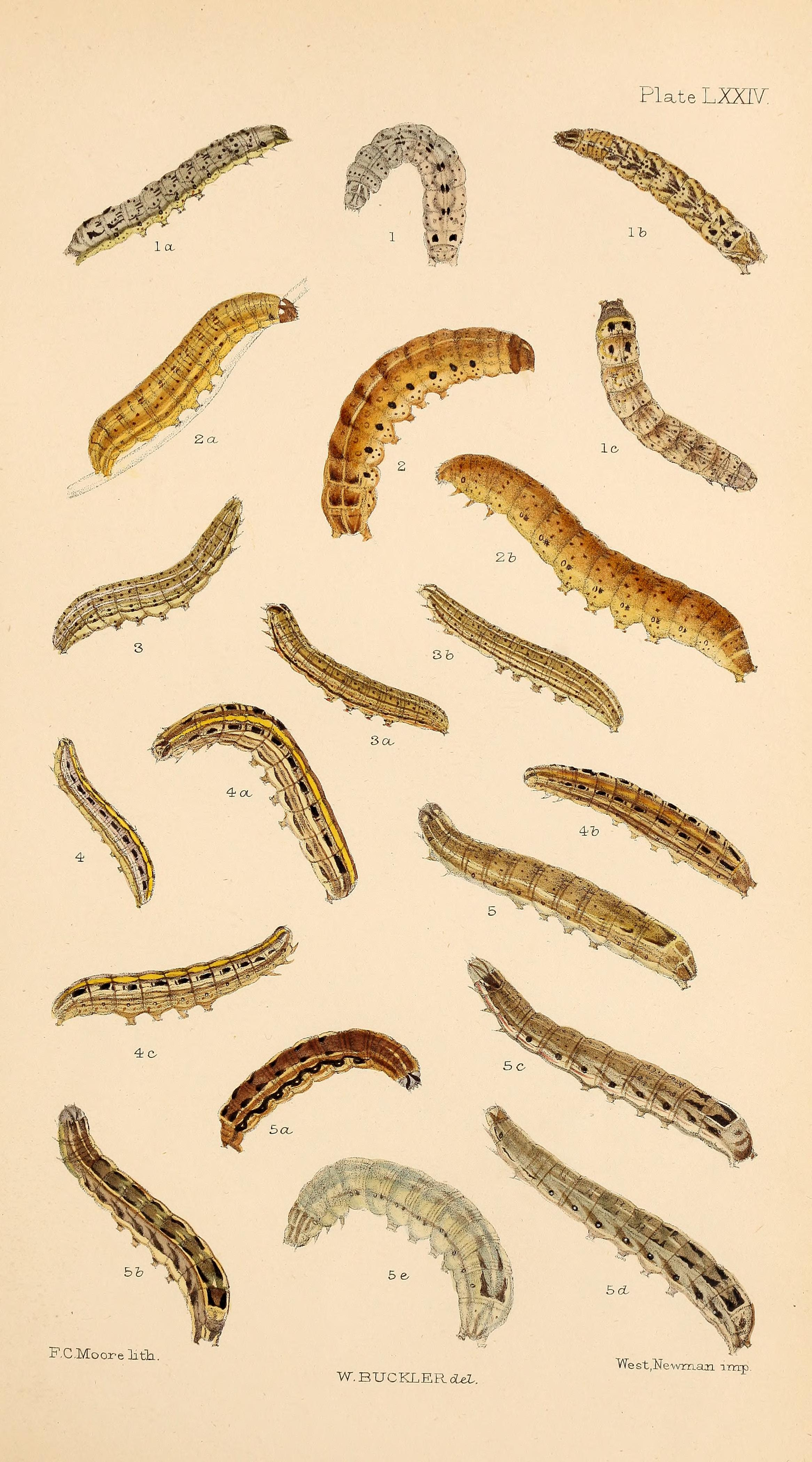
1,1a,1b,1c larva after last moult

The adults fly at night from the latter half of July to August and are attracted to light and sugar.

The larva is brown with v-shaped markings along the back. It feeds on a wide variety of plants (see list below). The species overwinters as a larva.

== Recorded food plants ==
- Arum – Cuckoo pint
- Crataegus – Hawthorn
- Hedera – Ivy
- Primula
- Prunus – Blackthorn
- Rubus
- Rumex
- Salix – Willow
- Ulmus – Elm
- Urtica – Nettle
- Viola
