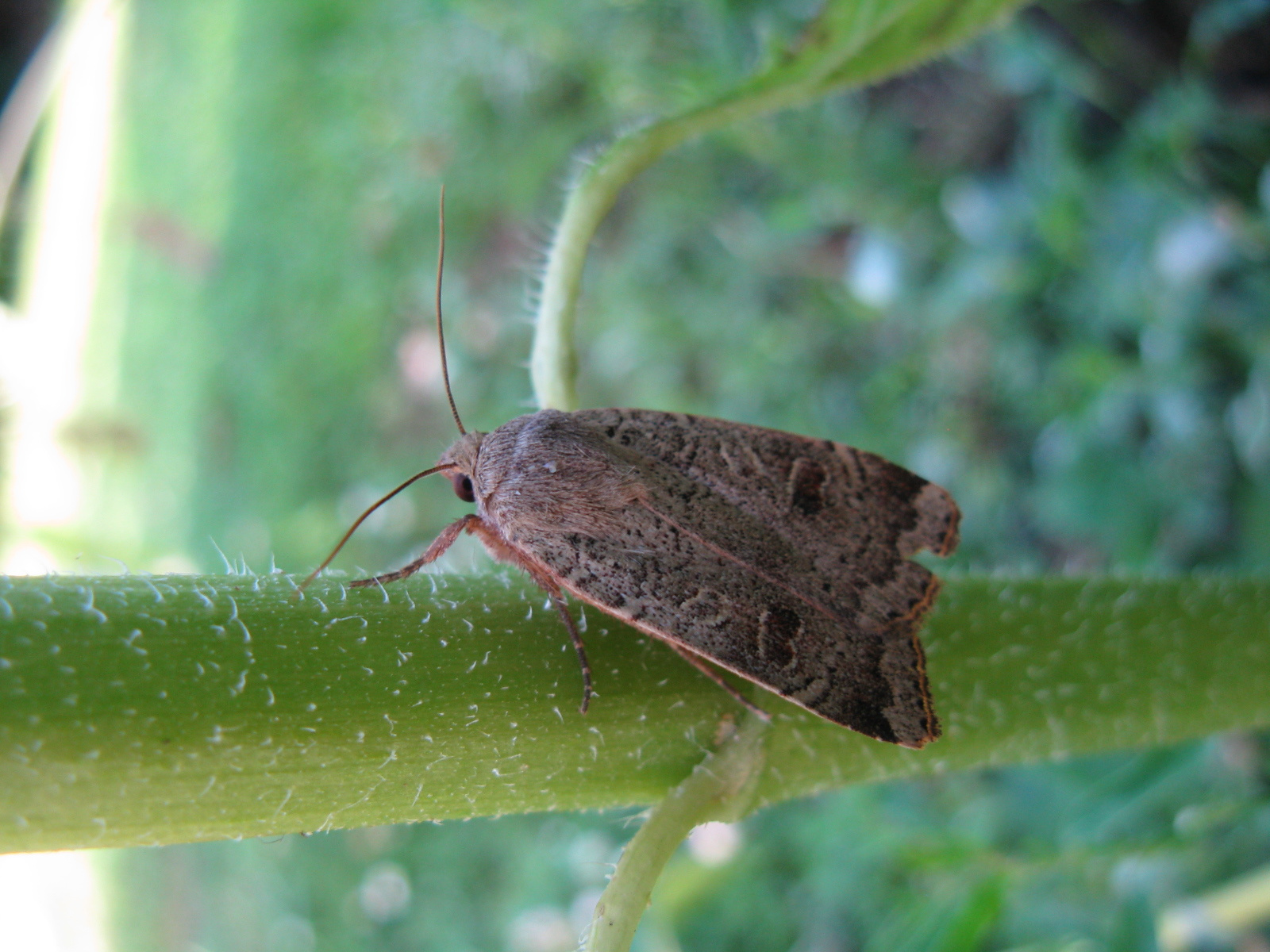

Scientific classification
- Domain: Eukaryota
- Kingdom: Animalia
- Phylum: Arthropoda
- Class: Insecta
- Order: Lepidoptera
- Superfamily: Noctuoidea
- Family: Noctuidae
- Genus: Noctua
- Species: N. interposita

Binomial name
- Noctua interposita Hübner, 1790

= Noctua interposita =

Species of moth

Noctua interposita is a moth of the family Noctuinae. It is found in Europe and West Asia (Turkey, Caucasus, Armenia).

The wingspan is 39–44 mm. The larvae are polyphagous.
