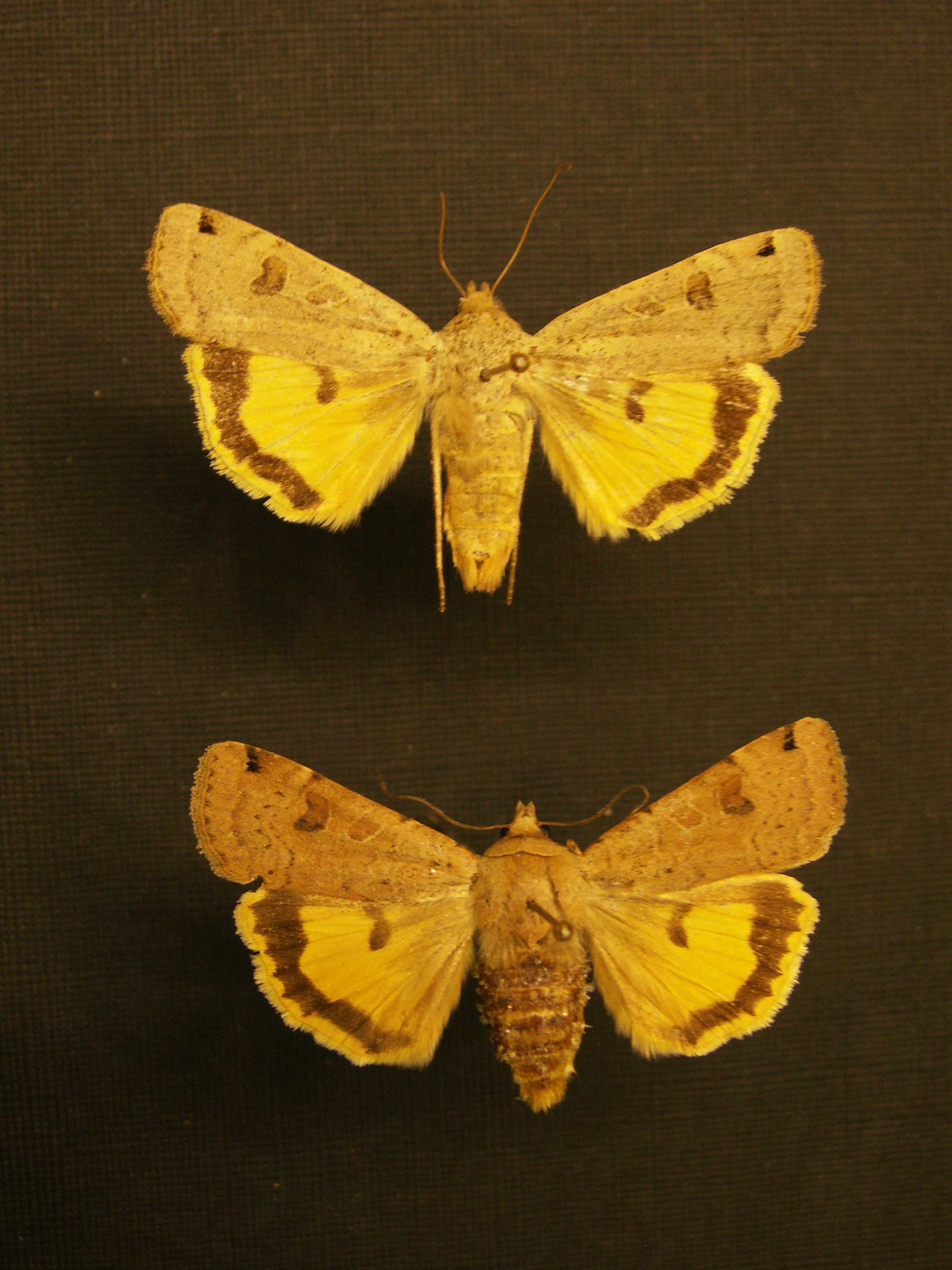
- Mounted male and female

Scientific classification
- Domain: Eukaryota
- Kingdom: Animalia
- Phylum: Arthropoda
- Class: Insecta
- Order: Lepidoptera
- Superfamily: Noctuoidea
- Family: Noctuidae
- Genus: Noctua
- Species: N. orbona

Binomial name
- Noctua orbona (Hufnagel, 1766)

= Noctua orbona =

Lunar yellow underwing

Species of moth

Noctua orbona, the lunar yellow underwing, is a moth of the family Noctuoidea. It is found in the Palearctic.

== Distribution ==
North Africa (Morocco and Libya), western, central and southern Europe. In the north to Scotland, southern Norway, central Sweden and southern Finland. From the Baltic states across through Russia to the Urals. In Asia, the southern records extend from Turkey, Syria, Lebanon, Iraq and questionably to Iran, Afghanistan and northern India. The distribution area in the East Palearctic includes Kazakhstan, Turkmenistan, Tajikistan, Kyrgyzstan and Uzbekistan.

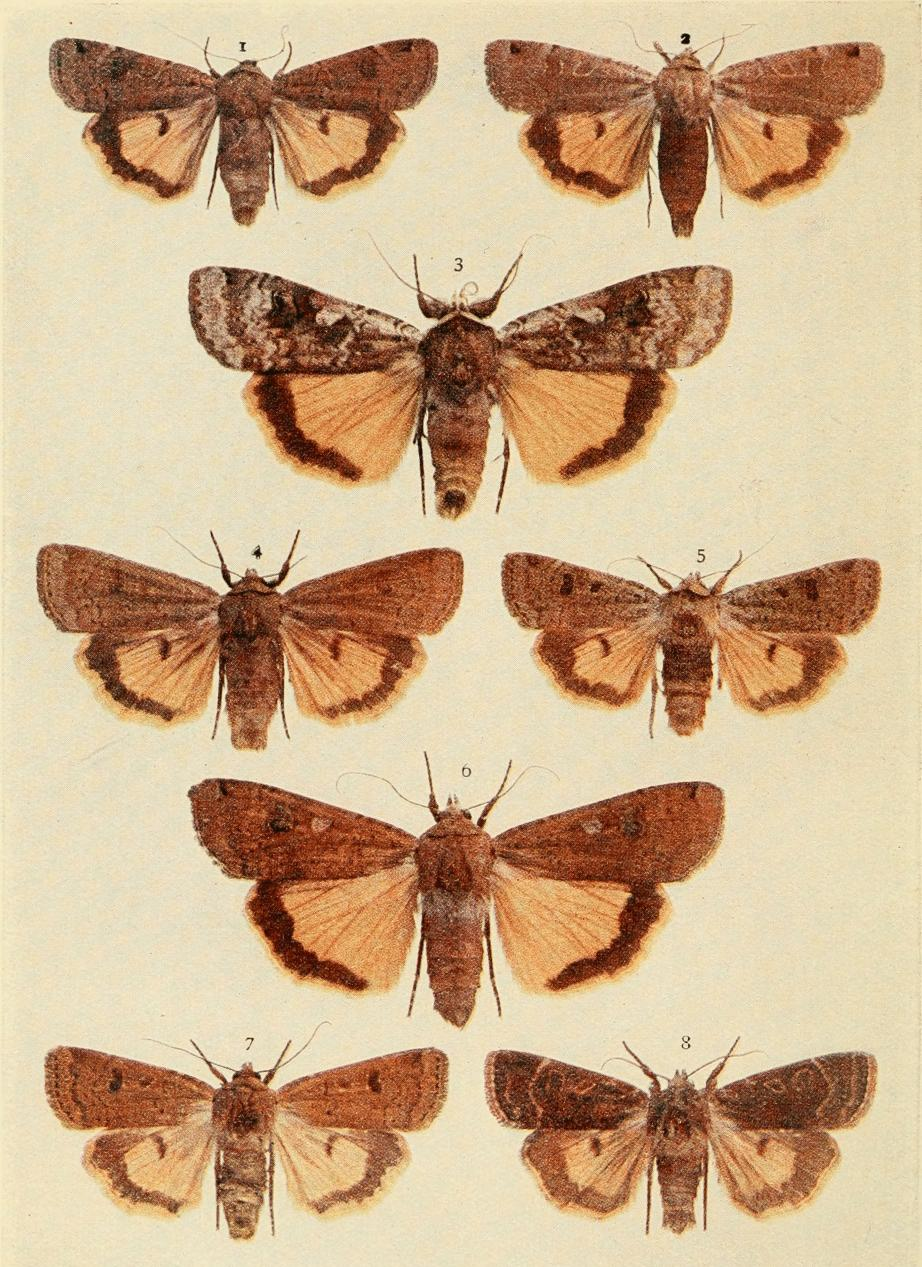
Comparison 1, 2. lunar yellow underwing Noctua orbona 4, 5, 7, 8. lesser yellow underwing Noctua comes 3, 6. large yellow underwing Noctua pronuba

The wingspan is 38–45 mm. Forewings with weakly pronounced lines, the colour is leather yellowish brown to reddish brown, often obscured at the margin. It resembles Noctua comes but has a constant and characteristic ink black spot on the costa near the apex of the forewing. In the overall impression a broad-winged species. Central European populations on average smaller than Noctua comes.

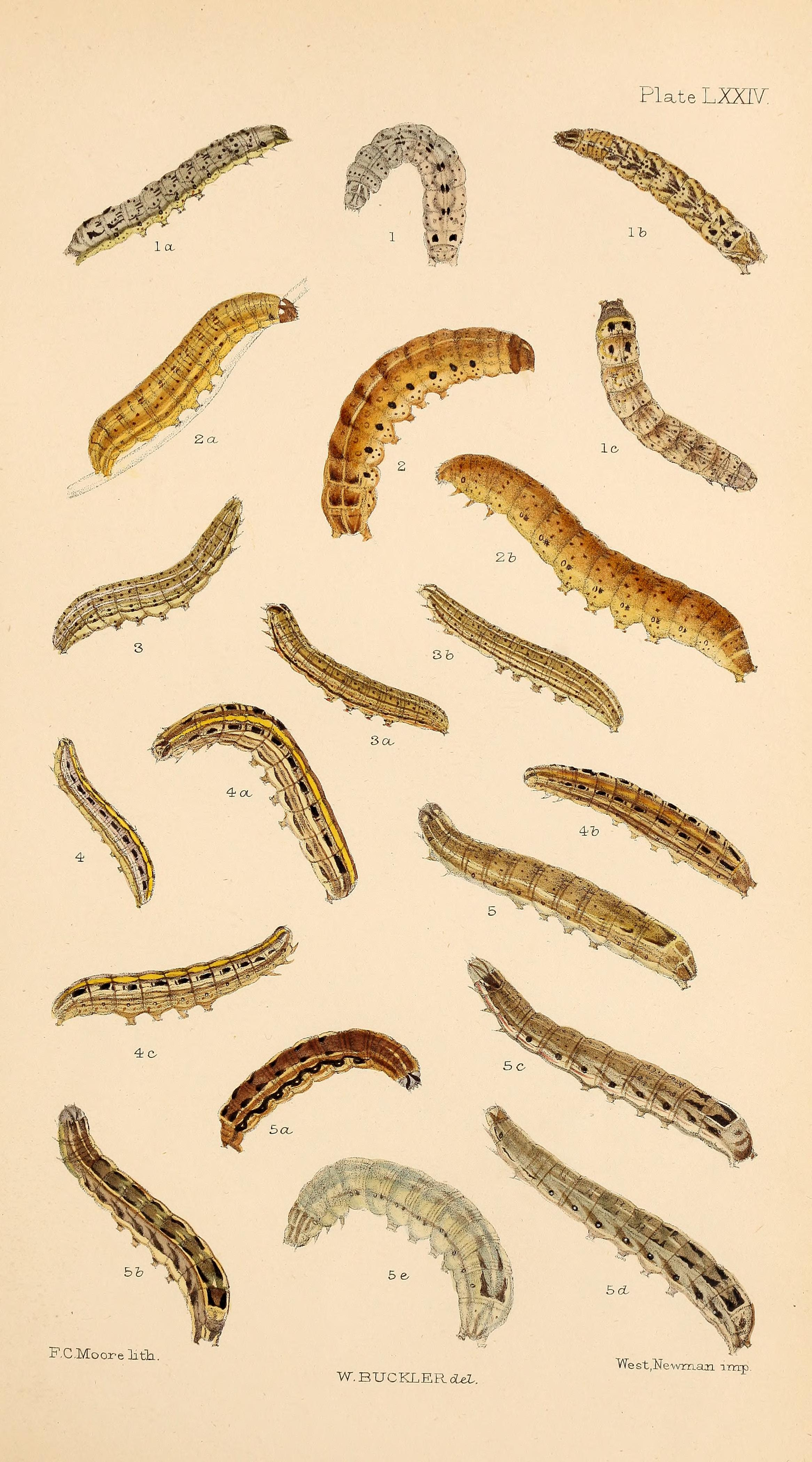
4, 4a, 4b,4c larva after last moult 5, 5a, 5b, 5c, 5d 5 e larvae in various stages

The moth flies from June to September depending on the location.

The hemispherical egg has a flattened base. It is initially whitish and turns orange shortly before the hatching of the larva. The surface is ribbed.

The colouration of the caterpillar varies from ochre yellow to brown-grey. It has three whitish dorsal lines. Between the dorsal lines, a black, elongated spot is developed on each segment. The caterpillar is lighter coloured on the sides with a wide reddish grey lateral stripe. A black, yellow-lined spot is present on the after shield. The brownish head has a fine mesh pattern and two dark arc stripes. The pronotum is also brownish and shows three bright longitudinal lines. The pupa is glossy brown to brown-red.

The larvae feed on various herbaceous plants and grasses.
