= Noctua noacki =

Conservation status
- Least Concern (IUCN 3.1)

Scientific classification
- Kingdom: Animalia
- Phylum: Arthropoda
- Clade: Pancrustacea
- Class: Insecta
- Order: Lepidoptera
- Superfamily: Noctuoidea
- Family: Noctuidae
- Genus: Noctua
- Species: N. noacki

Binomial name
- Noctua noacki (Boursin, 1957)

Synonyms
- Triphaena noacki Boursin, 1957

Species of moth

Noctua noacki is a species of moth of the family Noctuidae. It is found on the Canary Islands.

The wingspan is 46–49 mm (1.8–1.9 in) in males and 49–50 mm (1.9–2.0 in) in females.

== Subspecies ==
Two or three subspecies are recognized:

- Noctua noacki noacki (Boursin, 1957)
- Noctua noacki distincta Pinker, 1969
- Noctua noacki palmae Pinker & Bacallado, 1975
