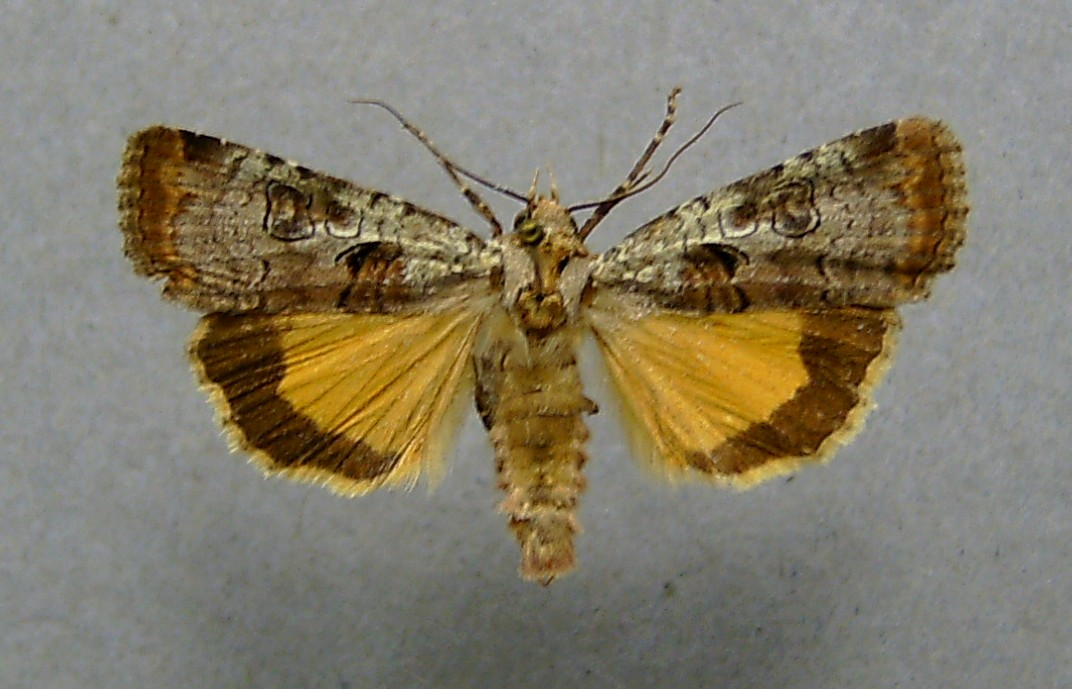

Scientific classification
- Kingdom: Animalia
- Phylum: Arthropoda
- Clade: Pancrustacea
- Class: Insecta
- Order: Lepidoptera
- Superfamily: Noctuoidea
- Family: Noctuidae
- Subfamily: Noctuinae
- Genus: Epilecta; Hübner, 1821

= Epilecta =

Genus of moths of the family Noctuidae

Epilecta is a genus of moths of the family Noctuidae. It consists of only one species, Epilecta linogrisea.
