= Noctua atlantica =

Conservation status
- Least Concern (IUCN 3.1)

Scientific classification
- Kingdom: Animalia
- Phylum: Arthropoda
- Clade: Pancrustacea
- Class: Insecta
- Order: Lepidoptera
- Superfamily: Noctuoidea
- Family: Noctuidae
- Genus: Noctua
- Species: N. atlantica

Binomial name
- Noctua atlantica (Warren, 1905)

Synonyms
- Agrotis atlantica Warren, 1905

Species of moth

Noctua atlantica is a species of yellow underwing moth belonging to the family Noctuidae, the cutworms. This moth is endemic to the Azores.

== Taxonomy ==
Noctua atlantica was first formally described in 1905 as Agrostis atlantica by the English entomologist William Warren from types which had been collected on the Azores in 1903 by the Scottish ornithologist William Robert Ogilvie-Grant, who collected a series of 3 types from Terceira, Graciosa and São Jorge. In 1971 it was transferred to the genus Noctua by the Austrian lepidopterist Rudolf Pinker.

== Description ==
Noctua atlantica is may be identified within the genus Noctua by its wing pattern, having an ochre-brown hind wing. There are also differences in the male genitalia.

== Distribution and habitat ==
Noctua atlantica is endemic to the Azores where it is found on the islands of Corvo, Flores, Faial, Pico, Graciosa, São Jorge, Terceira and São Miguel. It is found in the uplands, at altitudes greater than 600 m (2,000 ft) above sea level. They prefer native forests, where the dominant tree is Juniperus brevifolia particularly where these forests are associated with grassy clearings. They also occur in sunny forest roads and glades of exotic coniferous plantations.

== Biology ==
Noctua atlantica larvae are polyphagous, feeding on native grasses of various species. The adults have been recorded almost throughout the calendar year, and individuals are recorded as being attracted to lights in the months between April and November. There are two generations per year in the high elevation populations. The younger larvae are nocturnal and hide on the host plant during the day while the older larvae are less strictly nocturnal.

== Conservation ==
Noctua atlantica has been assessed as Least Concern by the IUCN but its range may have contracted due to deforestation in the lower areas of the islands and the invasion of its remaining habitats buy invasive exotic plants may reduce the quality if its existing habitat.
