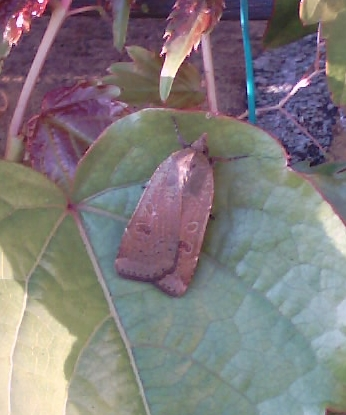

Scientific classification
- Kingdom: Animalia
- Phylum: Arthropoda
- Class: Insecta
- Order: Lepidoptera
- Superfamily: Noctuoidea
- Family: Noctuidae
- Genus: Noctua
- Species: N. comes

Binomial name
- Noctua comes Hübner, 1813

= Lesser yellow underwing =

Species of moth

The lesser yellow underwing (Noctua comes) is a moth of the family Noctuidae.

== Distribution ==
It is found in the Palearctic realm (Europe, North Africa, Canary Islands, Middle East, South Russia, Caucasus, Transcaucasia, Turkey, Iraq, Iran, Afghanistan, north-west India, Novosibirsk, Central Asia). It was introduced into British Columbia in about 1982 and has spread southward in the Pacific Northwest. It has recently been reported from Ontario (Crolla 2008). Full synonymy given in Lafontaine. It is a common species but not as abundant as its larger relative large yellow underwing (Noctua pronuba).

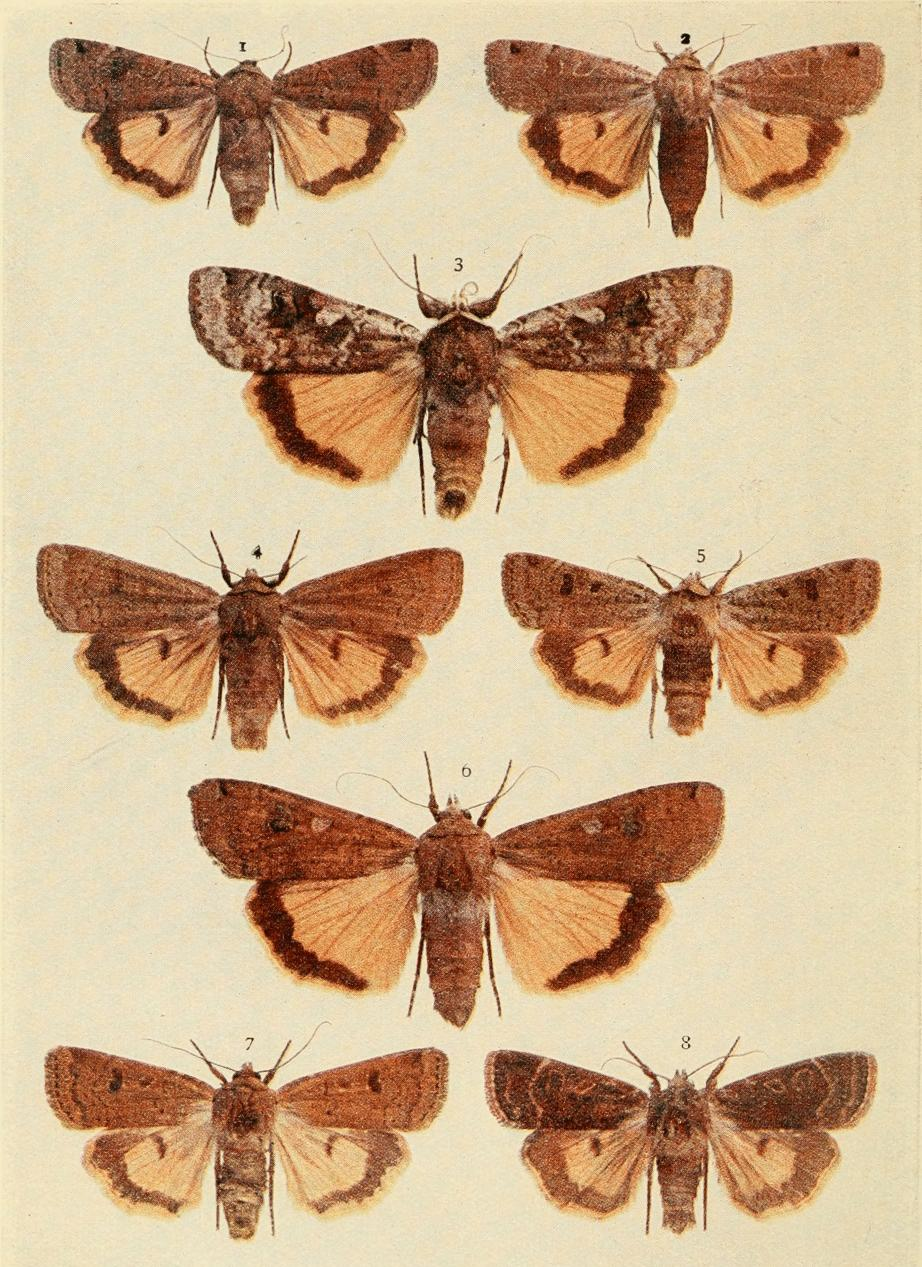
Comparison 1, 2. lunar yellow underwing (Noctua orbona) 4, 5, 7, 8. lesser yellow underwing (Noctua comes) 3, 6. large yellow underwing (Noctua pronuba)

== Description ==
This species generally has the appearance of a smaller (wingspan 38–48 mm) version of the large yellow underwing Noctua pronuba. The forewings are equally variable in pattern and colour, from pale clay to reddish clay, light brown to almost black. The stigmata are dark and outlined with pale yellow. The crosslines are weak. The wavy line flows on to the front edge as a no more than dark brown (never black) stain, which is sometimes extended down the entire wavy line. The hindwings are orange-yellow with a broad black sub-terminal band and central discal lunule (usually absent in Noctua pronuba). It is also similar to the lunar yellow underwing Noctua orbona. In the overall impression a broad-winged species.

It flies at night from July to September and is attracted to light and flowers such as heather, marram grass, and ragwort.

The larva is also very similar to that of Noctua pronuba – green or brown with black dashes along the back. Its feeding habits, however, are very different: this is not a "cutworm" but feeds on the foliage of a range of plants, trees, and shrubs as well as herbaceous plants (see list below). This species overwinters as a larva.

=== Notes ===
1. The flight season refers to the British Isles. This may vary in other parts of the range.

== Recorded food plants ==
- Betula – birch
- Calluna – heather
- Cirsium – thistle
- Crataegus – hawthorn
- Digitalis – foxglove
- Fragaria – strawberry
- Plantago – plantain
- Prunus – blackthorn
- Rumex – docks and sorrel
- Salix – willow

See Robinson, G. S. et al.

== Gallery ==
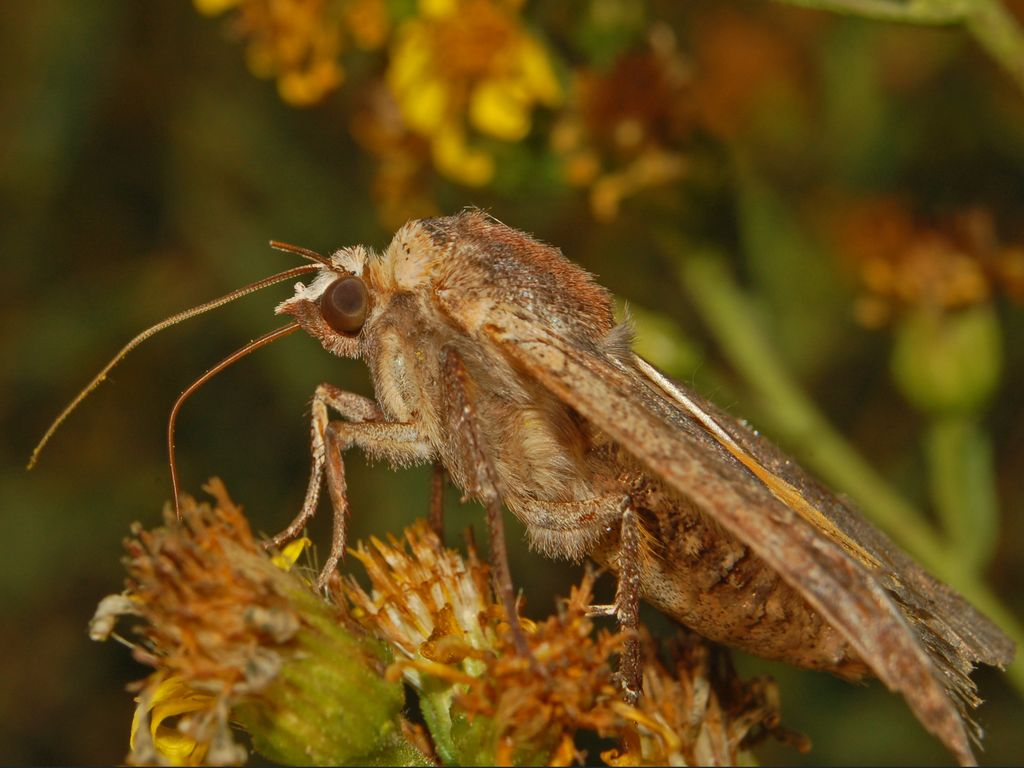

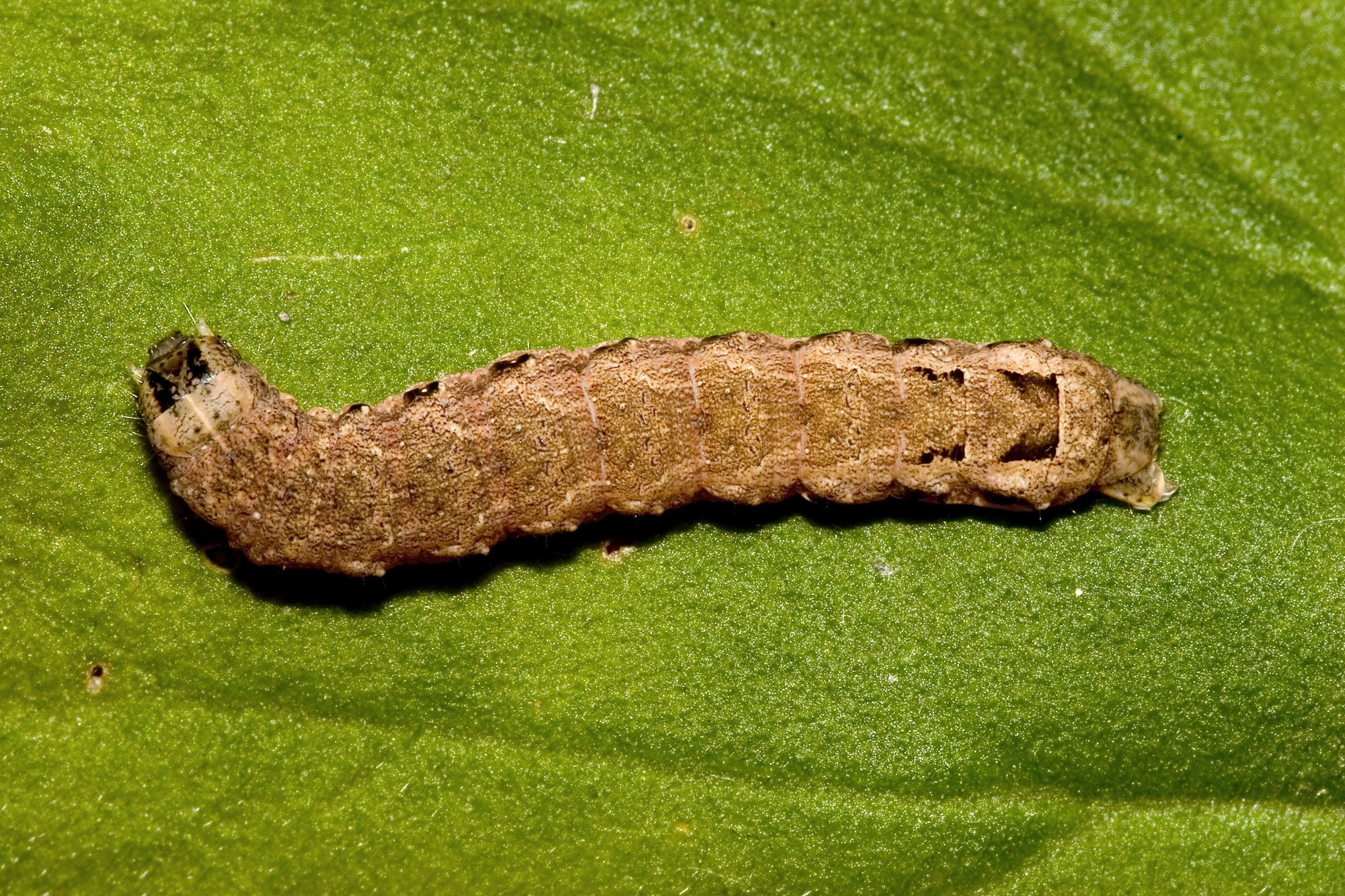

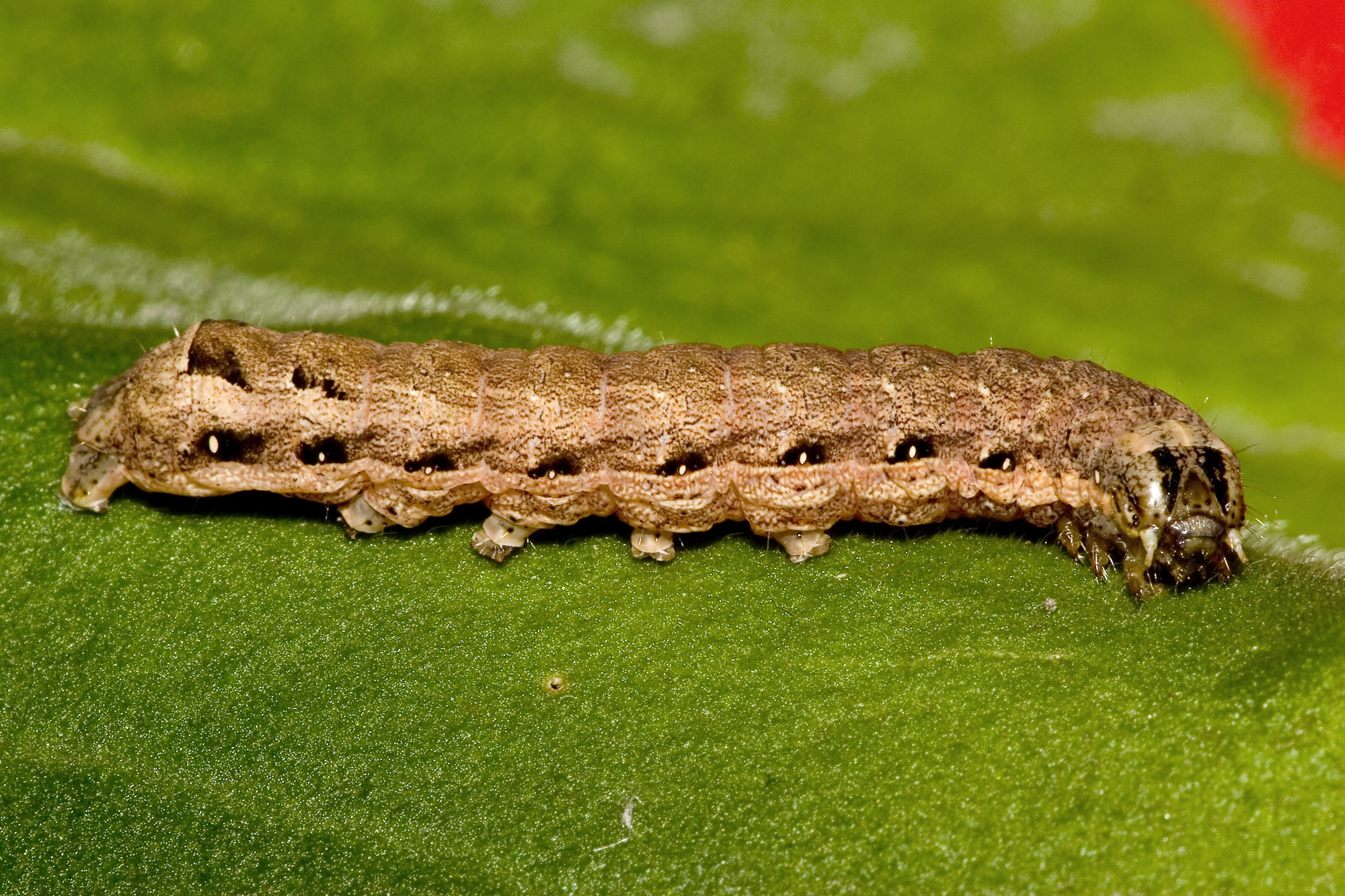

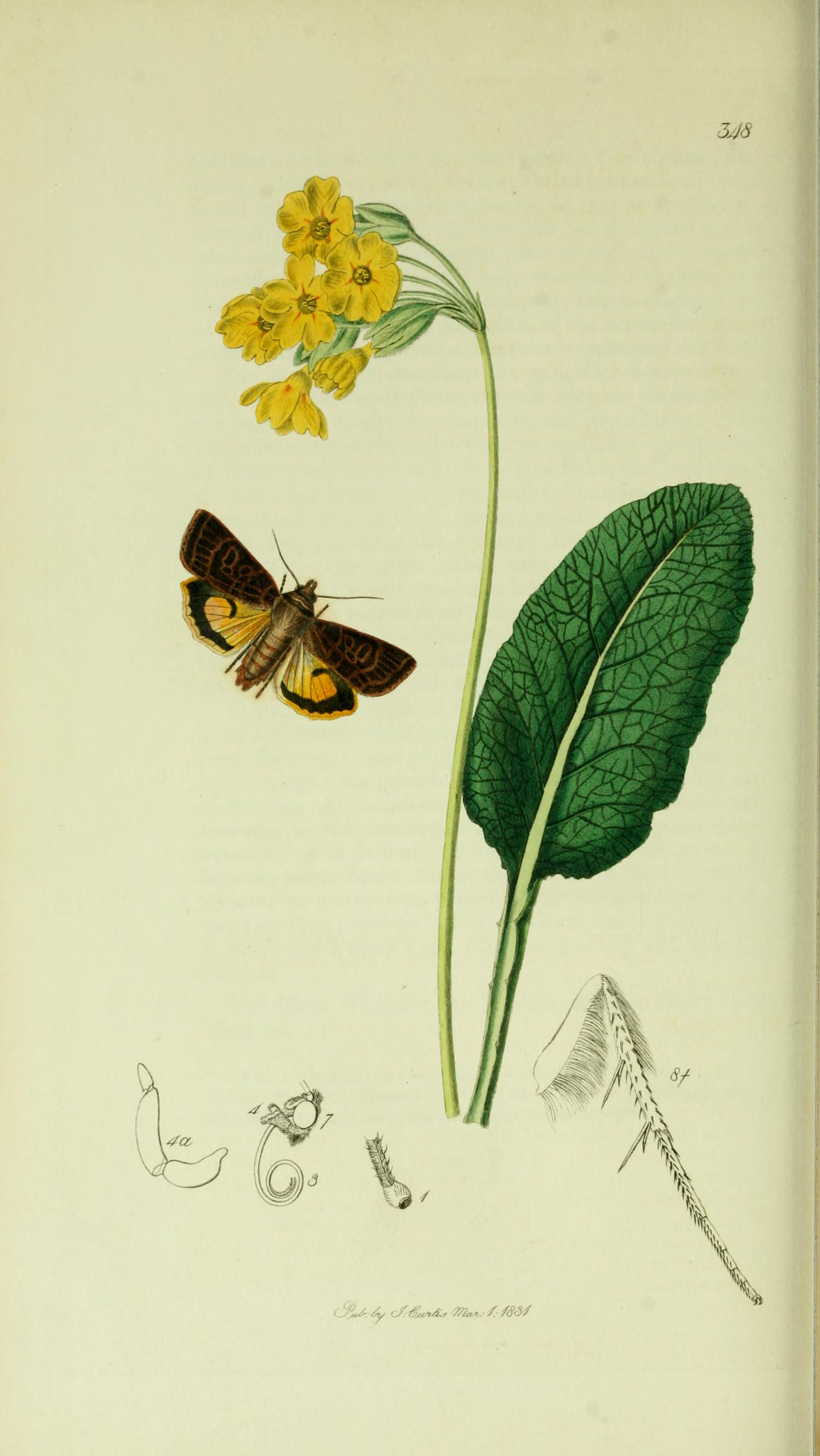

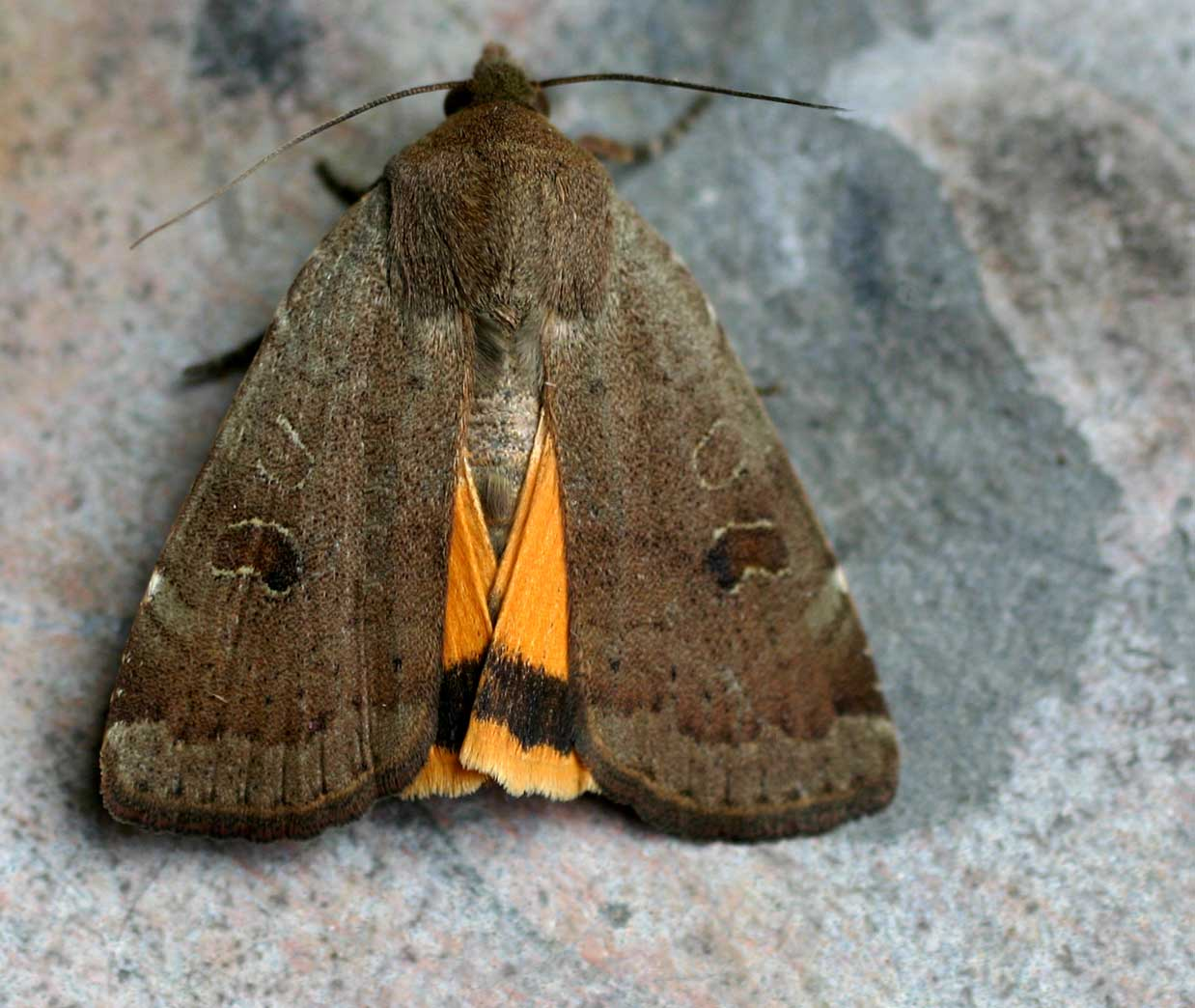

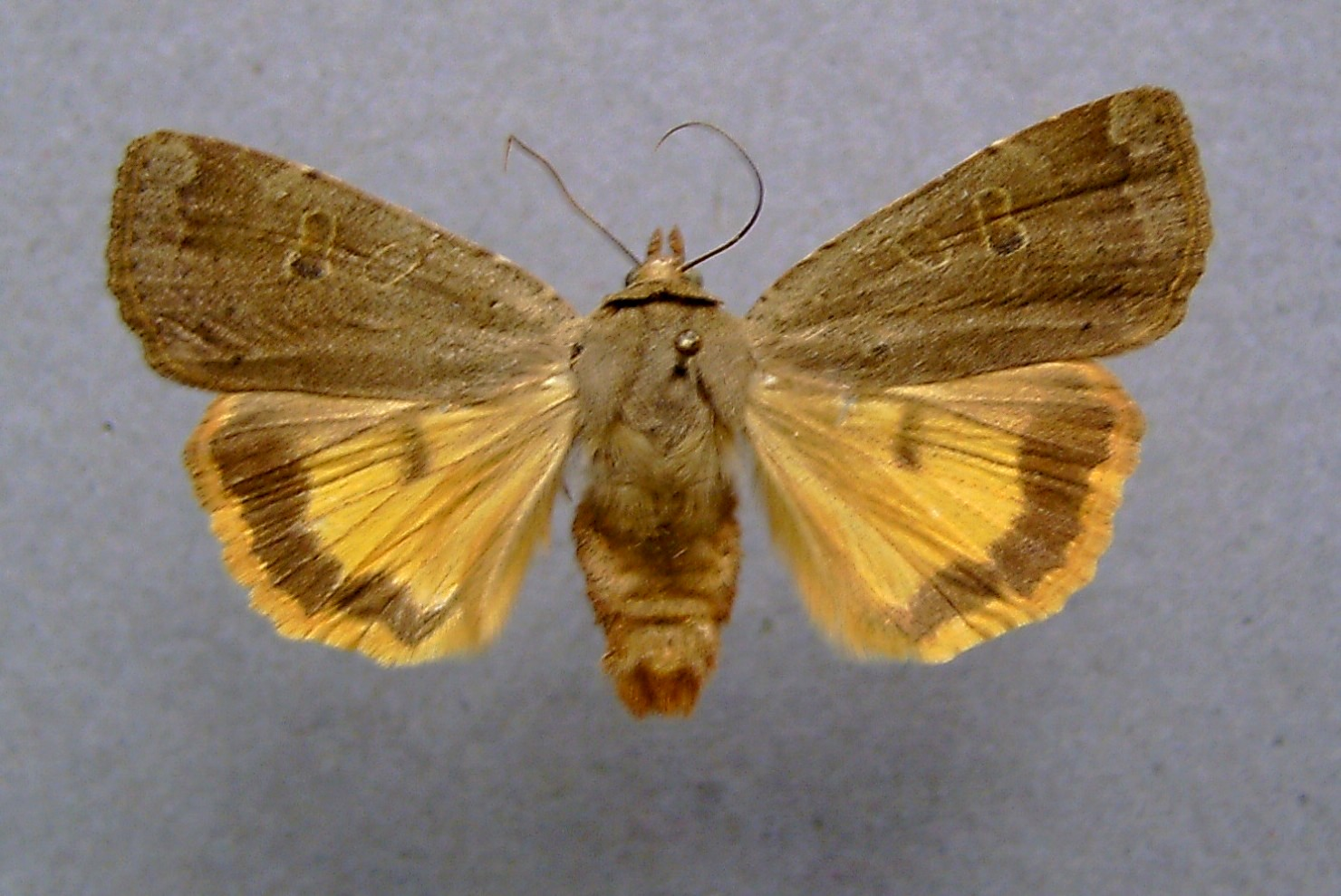
