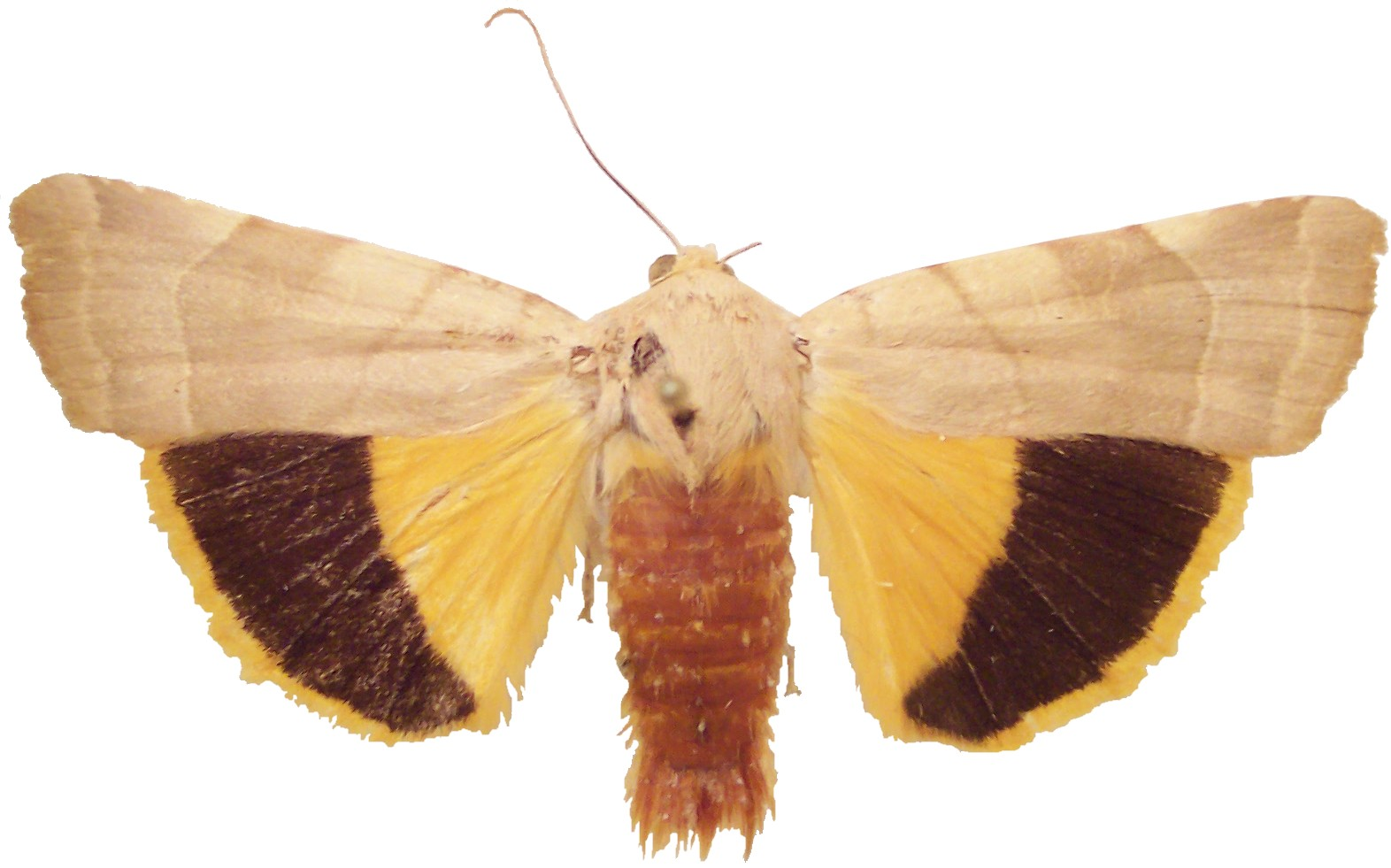
- Female

Scientific classification
- Kingdom: Animalia
- Phylum: Arthropoda
- Clade: Pancrustacea
- Class: Insecta
- Order: Lepidoptera
- Superfamily: Noctuoidea
- Family: Noctuidae
- Genus: Noctua
- Species: N. tirrenica

Binomial name
- Noctua tirrenica Biebinger, Speidel & Hanigk, 1983

= Noctua tirrenica =

Species of moth

Noctua tirrenica is a moth of the family Noctuidae. It was described by A. D. Biebinger, Wolfgang Speidel and H. Hanigk in 1983. It is found in southern Europe, from the Iberian Peninsula and France to southern Russia.

The wingspan is 46–56 mm. Adults are on the wing from June to October in one generation per year.

The larvae are polyphagous on various herbaceous plants.
