= Noctua tertia =

Scientific classification
- Domain: Eukaryota
- Kingdom: Animalia
- Phylum: Arthropoda
- Class: Insecta
- Order: Lepidoptera
- Superfamily: Noctuoidea
- Family: Noctuidae
- Genus: Noctua
- Species: N. tertia

Binomial name
- Noctua tertia Mentzer, Moberg & Fibiger, 1991

Species of moth

Noctua tertia is a moth of the family Noctuidae. It is found in the Balkans (Greece and Bulgaria), Turkey and Iran. It has recently been recorded from forests in Upper Galilee (Nahal Keziv, Mount Meron) in Israel.

Adults are on wing in August. There is one generation per year.
