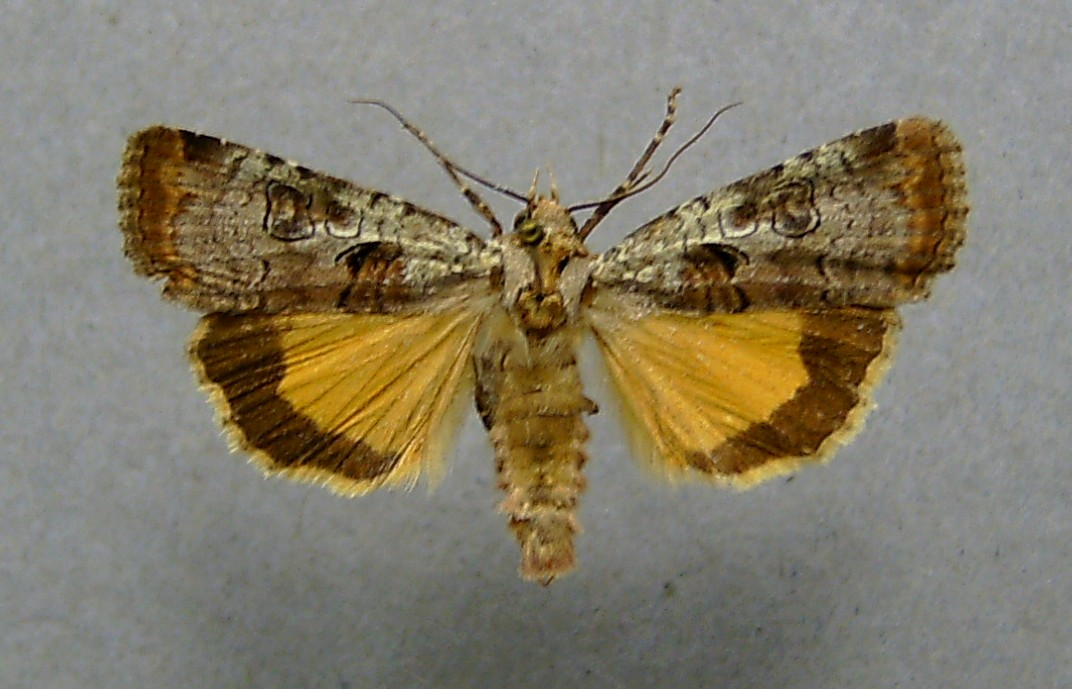

Scientific classification
- Kingdom: Animalia
- Phylum: Arthropoda
- Class: Insecta
- Order: Lepidoptera
- Superfamily: Noctuoidea
- Family: Noctuidae
- Genus: Epilecta
- Species: E. linogrisea

Binomial name
- Epilecta linogrisea (Denis & Schiffermüller, 1775)

Synonyms
- Noctua linogrisea

= Epilecta linogrisea =

Species of moth

Epilecta linogrisea is a moth of the family Noctuidae. It is found in Central and Southern Europe, Algeria, Morocco, the Caucasus, Armenia, Turkey, North-Western Iran, Syria, Israel and Lebanon.

== Description ==
The wingspan is 32–41 mm.E. linogrisea Schiff. (14g). Forewing greyish white, diffusely dark grey along costa and inner margin and especially on inner line below median vein; claviform stigma slight, marked by a black line;orbicular and reniform with fine black rings; the former round with pale grey centre, the latter with centre blackish; a quadrate black spot on costa before submarginal line, beyond which the marginal area is brown red: hindwing yellow, with broad black border; the base and costa grey; fringe ochreous. Occurs chiefly in the South of Europe, Spain, Greece, France, and Germany, but also found in Scandinavia; in Asia in Armenia, Syria, and Asia Minor. - ab. lutosa Stgr. has the ground colour yellowish grey instead ofwhite. Larva purple brown, with double black dorsal line enlarged to patches on the four front segments, on which also the white and black lateral line is wholly black: a row of oblique black

== Biology ==
The adults are on wing from May to September.

The larvae feed on various herbaceous plants, such as Digitalis purpurea and Stellaria and Primula species.
