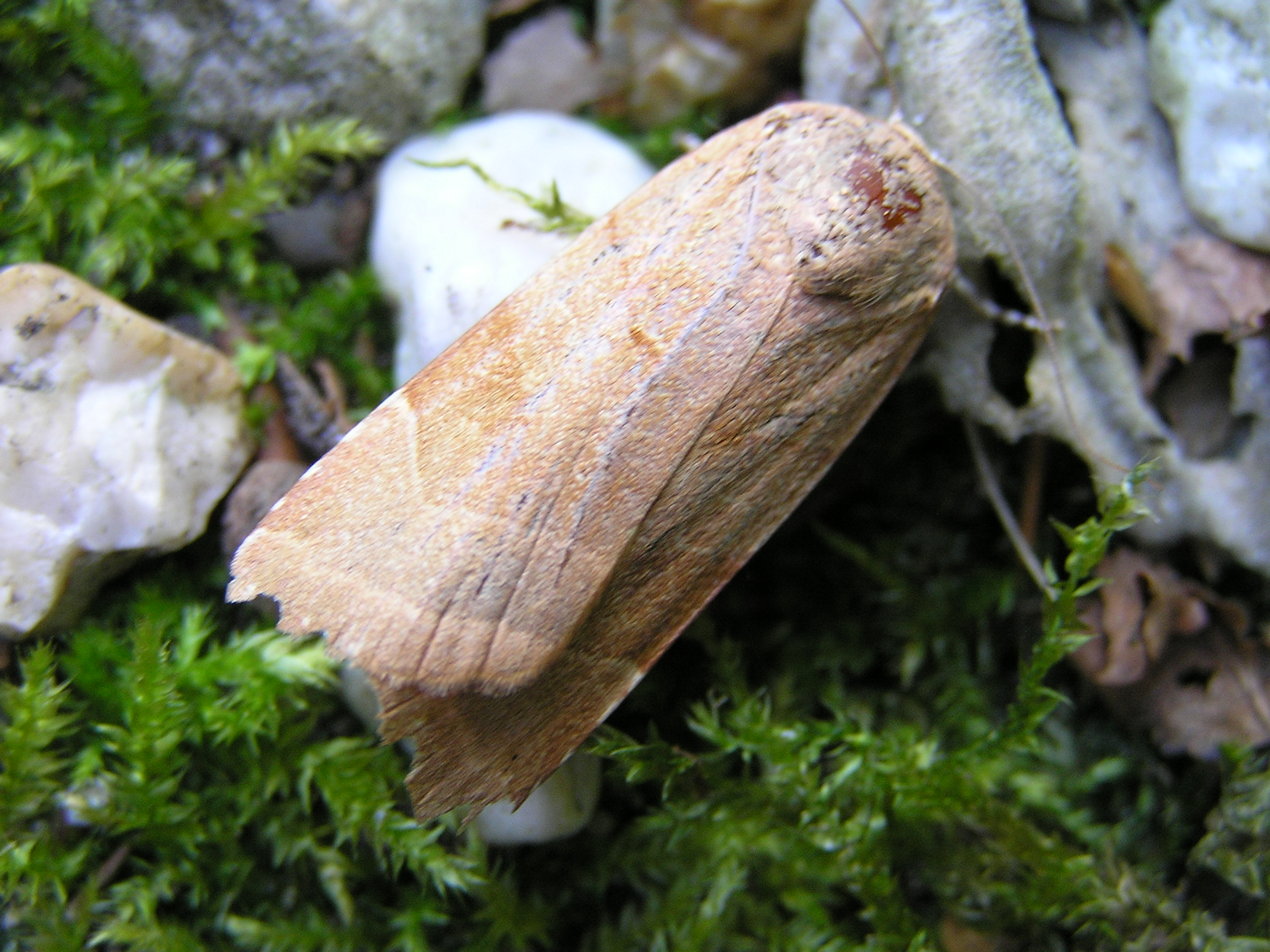

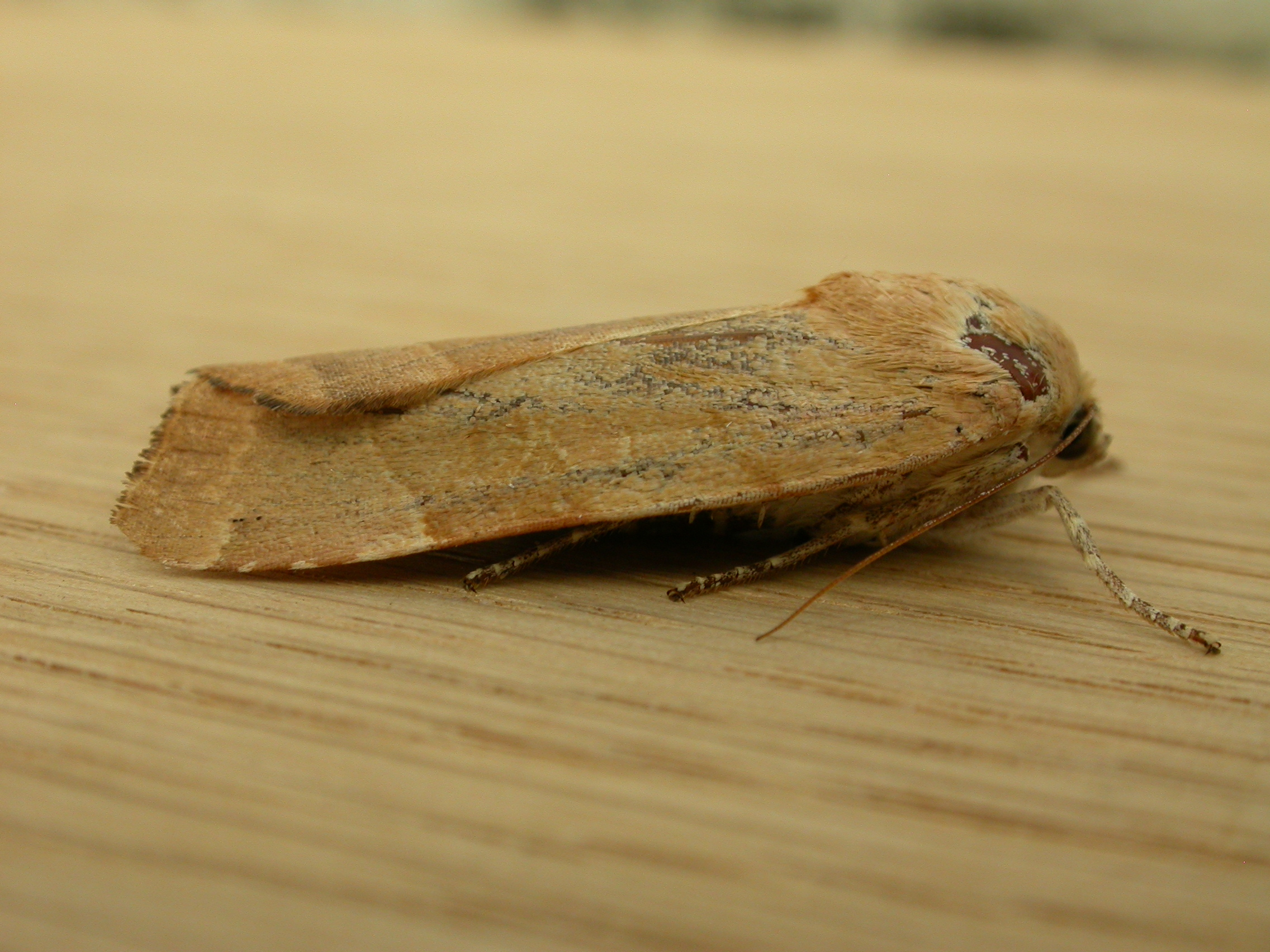

Scientific classification
- Kingdom: Animalia
- Phylum: Arthropoda
- Class: Insecta
- Order: Lepidoptera
- Superfamily: Noctuoidea
- Family: Noctuidae
- Genus: Noctua
- Species: N. fimbriata

Binomial name
- Noctua fimbriata (Schreber, 1759)

= Noctua fimbriata =

Broad-bordered yellow underwing

Species of moth

Noctua fimbriata, the broad-bordered yellow underwing, is a moth of the family Noctuidae. The species was first described in 1759 by Johann Christian Daniel von Schreber.

== Distribution ==
Noctua fimbriata can be found throughout Europe, including the UK, and in parts of Asia, where it ranges east to the Caucasus, Turkmenistan, and Western Siberia (Novosibirsk Oblast). Its type locality is in Germany.

== Technical description and variation ==
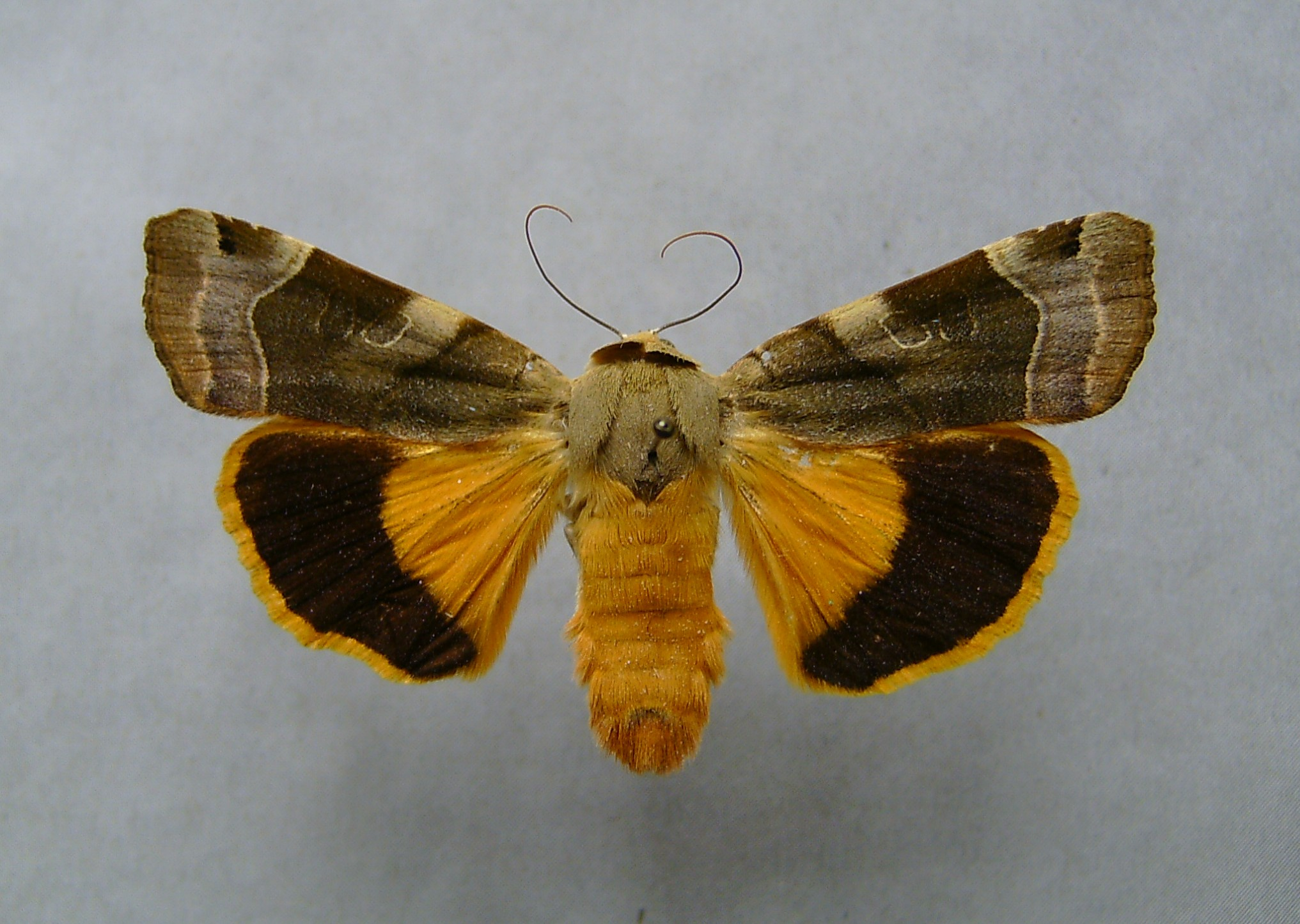
Mounted specimen

The wingspan is 45–55 mm. The length of the forewings is 22–27 mm. Forewing ranging from pale ochreous and rufous in the female to red-brown and olive-green in the male; ochreous males are rare; markings slight in the female, strong in the male;inner line dark; outer and submarginal pale; upper stigmata large, pale-edged, often touching; a dark costal blotch before submarginal line: hindwing and fringe orange, with a very broad black border; the pale rufous forms are known as ab. rufa Tutt, and the deep red-brown forms as ab. brunnea Tutt; the dark olive-green males are solani F., while the paler more ochreous green specimens (? males) are ab. virescens Tutt; — a rare and handsome form of the males called by Tutt ab. brunnea-virescens has the deep red-brown and olive-green tints combine. forewing blackish = obscura Lenz.].

Larvae are reddish ochreous, paler at the sides and with brown spots; dorsal line paler; a dark pale-edged bar across the 12th segment; spiracles pale on dark spots.

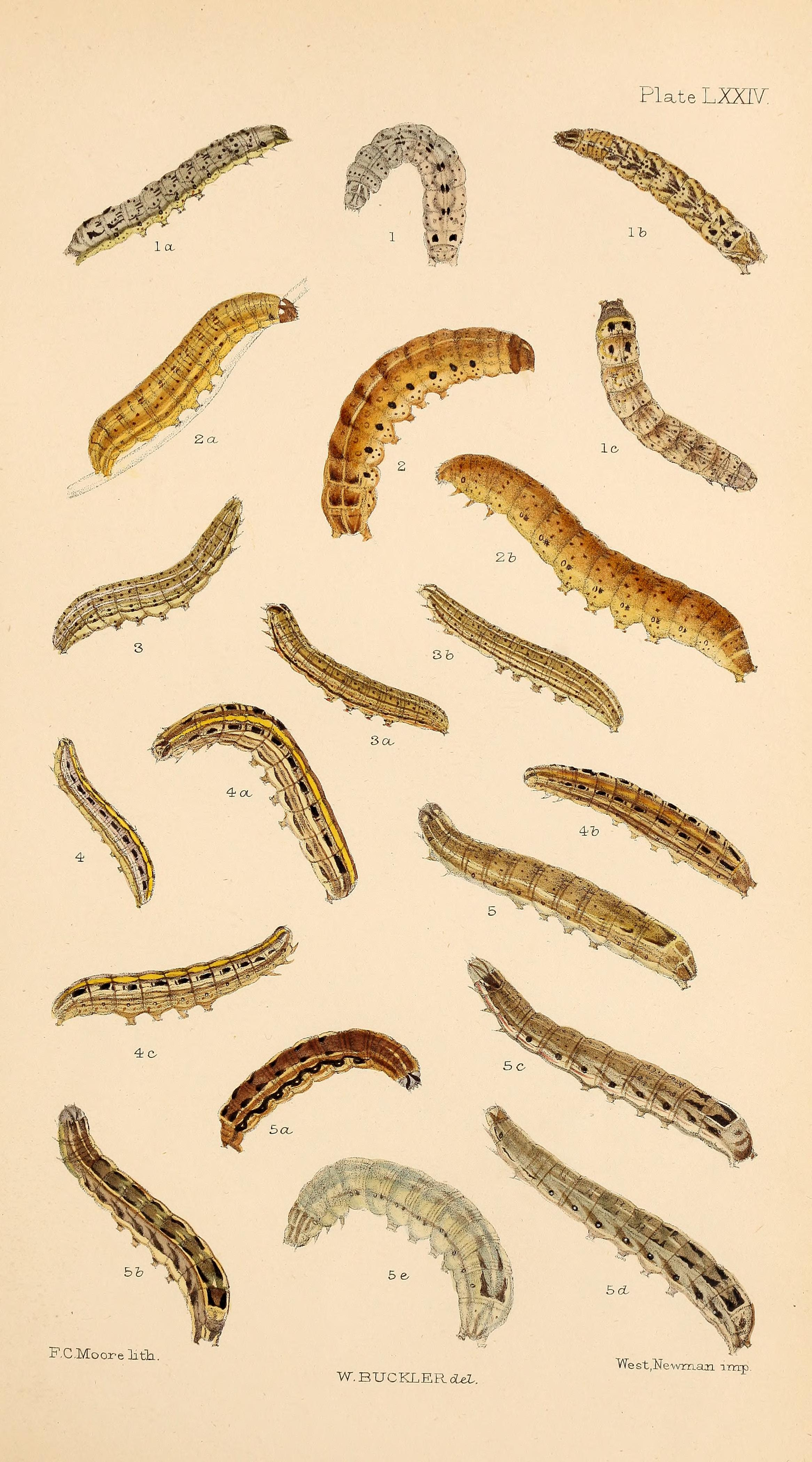
2,2a,2b larva after last moult

=== Similar species ===
Adults of the species are, due to size and forewing markings, not easily confused with any other species that occur in the Central European parts of its range. In the Mediterranean parts of its range, it resembles the congeneric species Noctua tirrenica, with which it may be confused.

== Biology ==
The moth flies in one generation from late June to October. The larvae are polyphagous, with hosts including Primula veris, Taraxacum, and Vitis. It overwinters in its larval stage.
