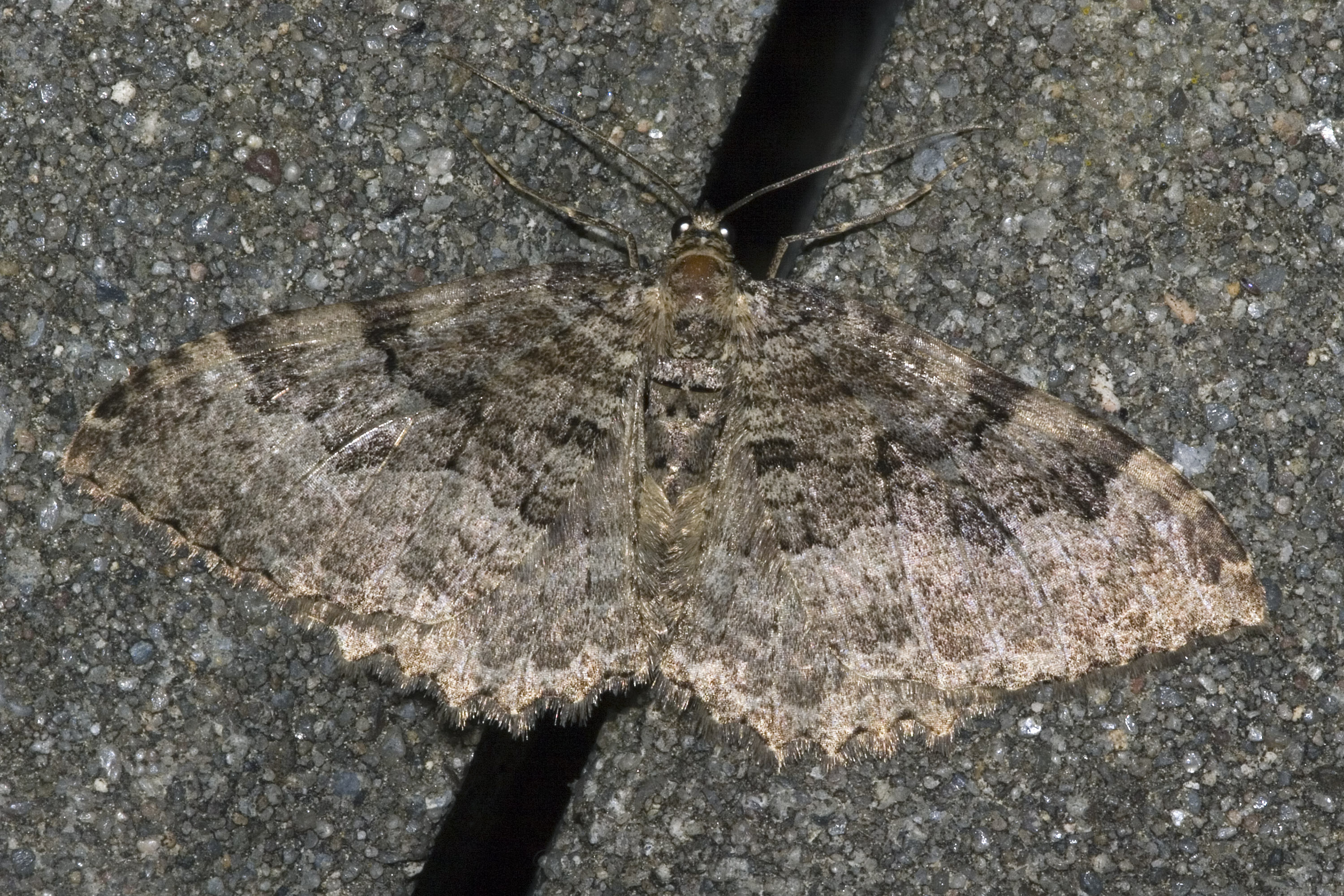
- Hydria cervinalis

Scientific classification
- Kingdom: Animalia
- Phylum: Arthropoda
- Clade: Pancrustacea
- Class: Insecta
- Order: Lepidoptera
- Family: Geometridae
- Subfamily: Larentiinae
- Tribe: Rheumapterini
- Genus: Hydria; Hübner, 1822

= Hydria (moth) =

Genus of moths

Hydria is a genus of moths in the family Geometridae. In some schemes, it is considered a synonym of Rheumaptera.

- Hydria alternata (Staudinger, 1896)
- Hydria cervinalis (Scopoli, 1763)
- Hydria gernoti Stadie, Fiebig & Rajaei, 2022
- Hydria gudarica Dufay, 1983
- Hydria hyrcana Staudinger, 1871
- Hydria incertata (Staudinger, 1882).
- Hydria ithys (L.B. Prout, 1937)
- Hydria loebeli Stadie, Fiebig & Rajaei, 2022
- Hydria montivagata (Duponchel, 1830)
- Hydria prunivorata Ferguson, 1955
- Hydria ravulata (Staudinger, 1892)
- Hydria relicta (Herbulot, 1953)
- Hydria schachti Stadie, Fiebig & Rajaei, 2022
- Hydria undulata (Linnaeus, 1758)

In addition, see Rheumaptera moscardonica Laever, 1983 as junior subjective synonym of Hydria montivagata (Duponchel, 1830) by Redondo & Gaston, 1999 cited by Hausmann & Viidalepp, 2012: 398).
