= Tissue =

Tissue may refer to:

== Biology ==
- Tissue (biology), an ensemble of similar (or dissimilar in structure but same in origin) cells that together carry out a specific function
- Triphosa haesitata, a species of geometer moth ("tissue moth") found in North America
- Triphosa dubitata, a species of geometer moth ("tissue") found in Afro-Eurasia

== Paper products ==
- Tissue paper, a type of thin, gauzy translucent paper used for wrapping and cushioning items
- Tissue (cloth), a thin, transparent, and lightweight fabric
- Facial tissue, tissue paper used for wiping the face or blowing one's nose
- Japanese tissue, tissue paper from Japan made of vegetable fibers
- Toilet paper, tissue paper used for cleaning the anus
- Wrapping tissue, tissue paper used for wrapping and cushioning items

== Other ==
- Aerial tissue, an acrobatic art form and one of the circus arts
- "The Tissue (Tomaranai Seishun)", a 2011 song by Shiritsu Ebisu Chugaku
- Tissue, a 2017 poem by Imtiaz Dharker
