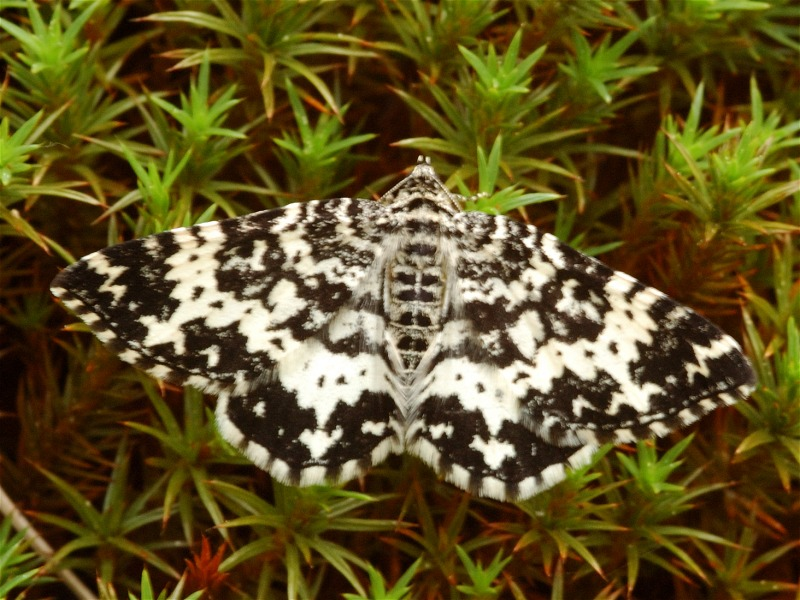

Scientific classification
- Kingdom: Animalia
- Phylum: Arthropoda
- Class: Insecta
- Order: Lepidoptera
- Family: Geometridae
- Genus: Rheumaptera
- Species: R. subhastata

Binomial name
- Rheumaptera subhastata (Nolcken, 1870)

Synonyms
- Cidaria subhastata Nolcken, 1870

= Rheumaptera subhastata =

Species of moth

Rheumaptera subhastata, the white-banded black moth, is a moth of the family Geometridae. It is found in the Palearctic and Nearctic realms, where it is widely distributed in western North America.

The wingspan is 26–31 mm. Adults are on wing from mid May to mid July. There is one generation per year.

The larvae feed on the foliage of Alnus species. They fold a leaf into a tent.
