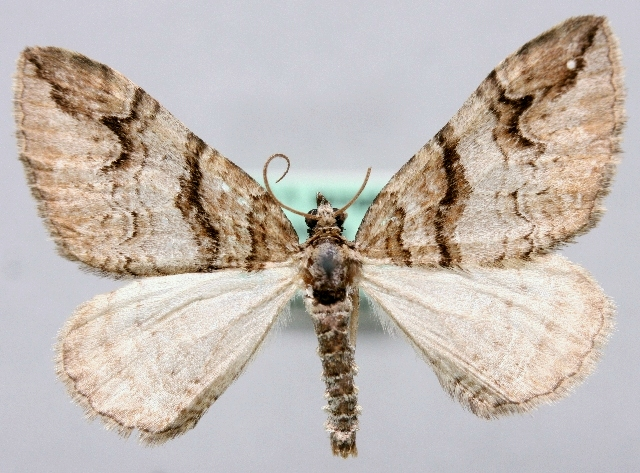
- Pareulype berberata

Scientific classification
- Kingdom: Animalia
- Phylum: Arthropoda
- Clade: Pancrustacea
- Class: Insecta
- Order: Lepidoptera
- Family: Geometridae
- Subfamily: Larentiinae
- Tribe: Rheumapterini
- Genus: Pareulype; Herbulot, 1951

= Pareulype =

Genus of moths

Pareulype is a genus of moths in the family Geometridae.

== Species in Europe ==
- Pareulype berberata (Denis & Schiffermüller, 1775)
- Pareulype casearia (Constant 1884)
- Pareulype lasithiotica (Rebel 1906)
