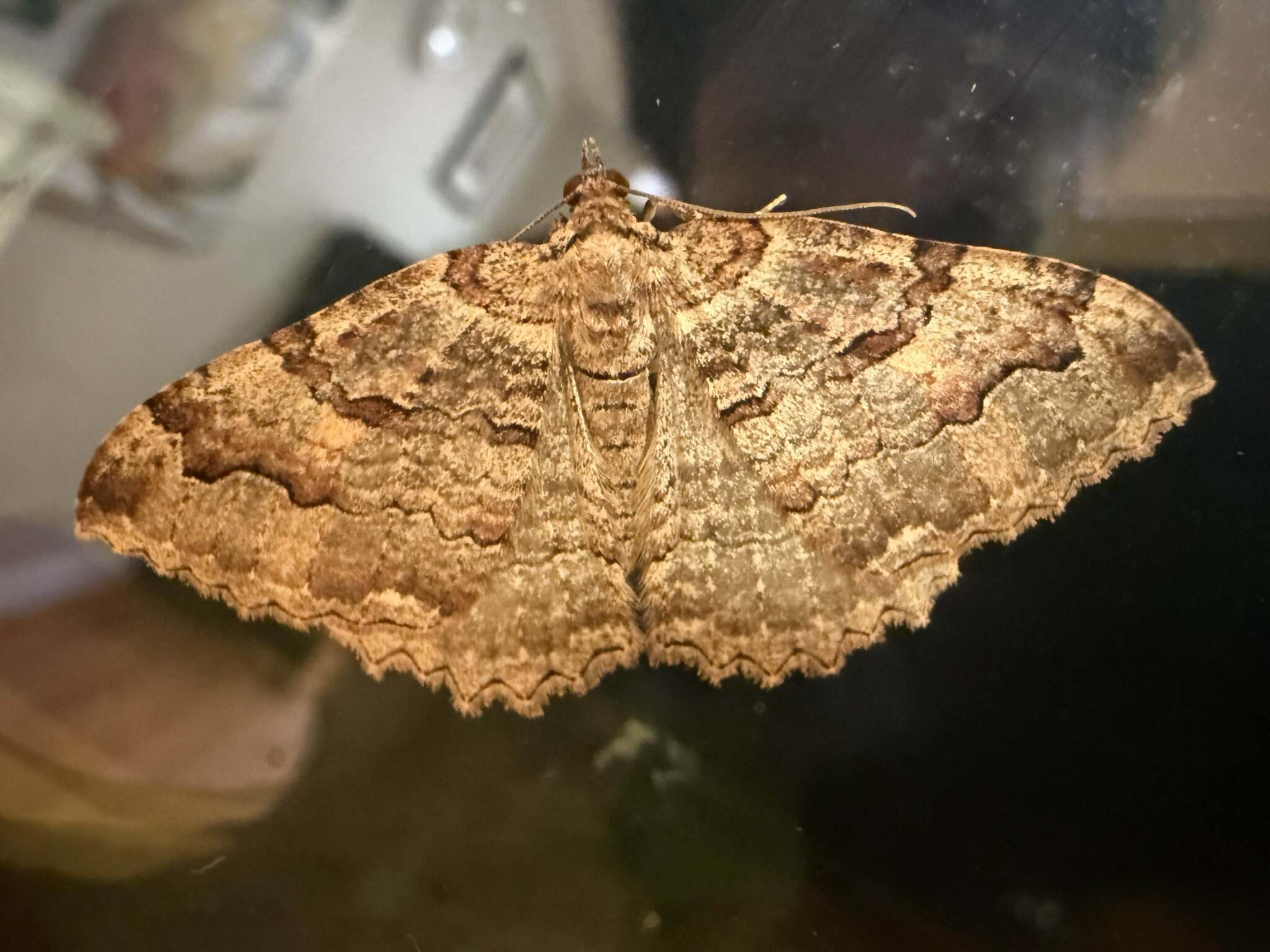
- In Vancouver, British Columbia

Scientific classification
- Kingdom: Animalia
- Phylum: Arthropoda
- Clade: Pancrustacea
- Class: Insecta
- Order: Lepidoptera
- Family: Geometridae
- Tribe: Rheumapterini
- Genus: Triphosa
- Species: T. haesitata

Binomial name
- Triphosa haesitata (Guenée in Boisduval & Guenée, 1858)

= Triphosa haesitata =

Species of moth

Triphosa haesitata, the tissue moth or American tissue moth, is a species of geometrid moth in the family Geometridae. It is found in North America.

== Subspecies ==
These two subspecies belong to the species Triphosa haesitata:

- Triphosa haesitata affirmaria (Walker, 1861)
- Triphosa haesitata haesitata (Guenée in Boisduval & Guenée, 1858)

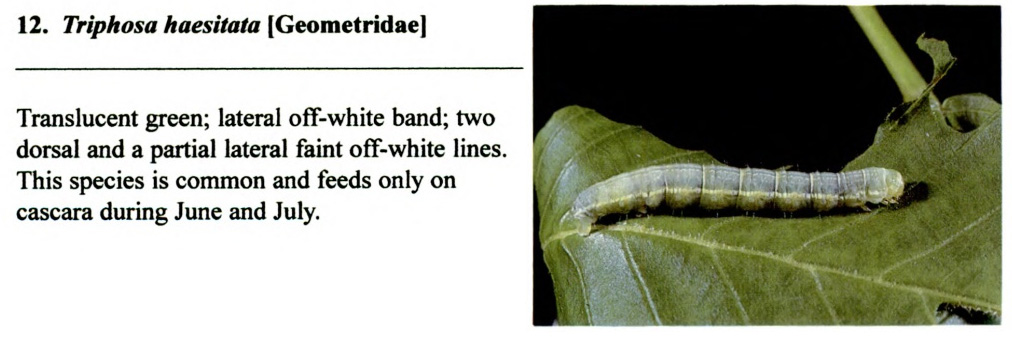
Triphosa haesitata caterpillar
