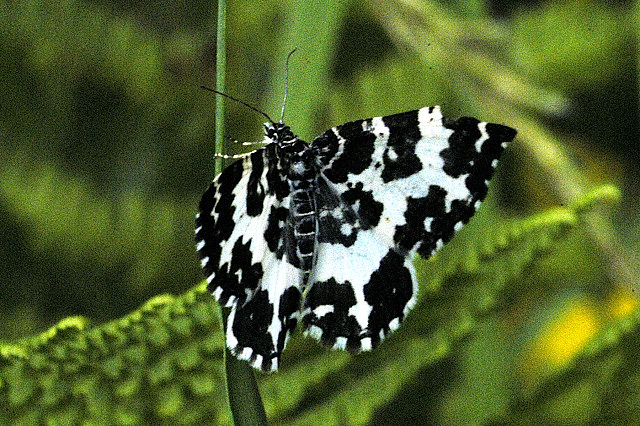
- Rheumaptera hastata

Scientific classification
- Kingdom: Animalia
- Phylum: Arthropoda
- Clade: Pancrustacea
- Class: Insecta
- Order: Lepidoptera
- Family: Geometridae
- Subfamily: Larentiinae
- Tribe: Rheumapterini
- Genus: Rheumaptera; Hübner, 1822

Synonyms
- Coryphista Hulst, 1896; Eutriphosa Gumppenberg, 1887; [?] Hydria Hübner, 1822

= Rheumaptera =

Genus of moths

Rheumaptera is a genus of moths of the family Geometridae erected by Jacob Hübner in 1822.

== Selected species ==
- Rheumaptera acutata D. Y. Xue & F. Meng, 1992
- Rheumaptera affinis D. Y. Xue & F. Meng, 1992
- Rheumaptera caucasica (Müller & Viidalepp)
- Rheumaptera exacta (Butler, 1882)
- Rheumaptera flavipes Ménétriés, 1858
- Rheumaptera fuegata (Staudinger, 1899)
- Rheumaptera hastata (Linnaeus, 1758)
- Rheumaptera hecate (Butler, 1878)
- Rheumaptera hedemannaria Oberthür, 1880</s
- Rheumaptera inanata Christoph, 1880
- Rheumaptera instabilis Alphéraky, 1883
- Rheumaptera latifasciaria Leech, 1891
- Rheumpatera meadii (Packard, 1874)
- Rheumaptera neocervinalis Inoue, 1982
- Rheumaptera ravulata Staudinger, 1892
- Rheumaptera scotaria (Hampson 1907)
- Rheumaptera subhastata (Nolcken, 1870)
- Rheumaptera turkmenica (Müller & Viidalepp)
- Rheumaptera veternata Christoph, 1880

For Rheumaptera cervinalis (Scopoli, 1763), Rheumaptera undulata (Linnaeus, 1758), Rheumaptera prunivorata Ferguson, 1955 and allies, see Hydria
