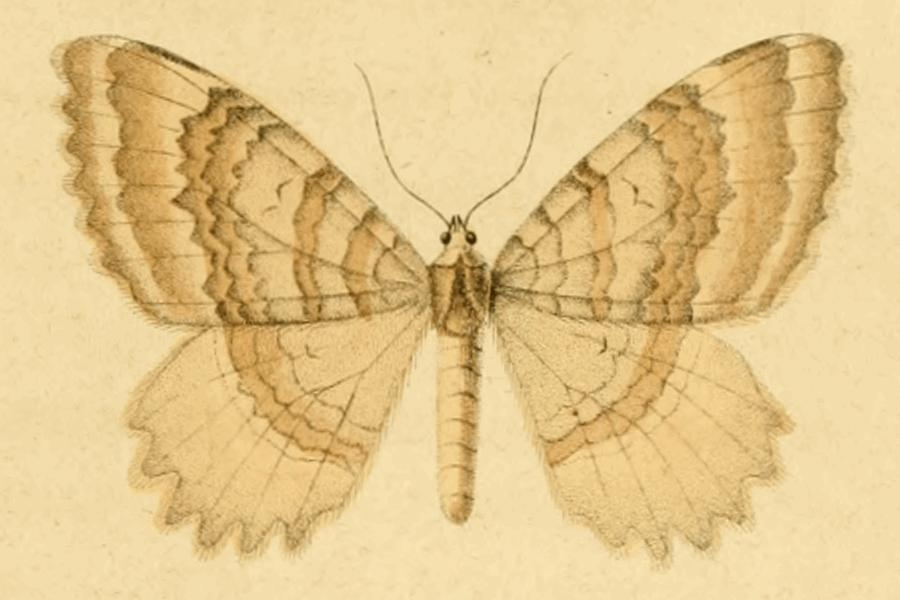

Scientific classification
- Kingdom: Animalia
- Phylum: Arthropoda
- Class: Insecta
- Order: Lepidoptera
- Family: Geometridae
- Genus: Triphosa
- Species: T. sabaudiata

Binomial name
- Triphosa sabaudiata (Duponchel, 1830)

Synonyms
- Larentia sabaudiata Duponchel, 1830; Larentia millierata Bruand, 1855

= Triphosa sabaudiata =

Species of moth

Triphosa sabaudiata is a species of moth of the family Geometridae that can be found in Albania, Andorra, Austria, Bulgaria, France (including the islands of Corsica), Germany, Greece, Italy, Liechtenstein, Romania, Spain, Switzerland, Ukraine, and in all states of the former Yugoslavia. Besides its central European distribution, it can also be found in Asia. The species is silvery gray coloured, and can be found up to elevations of 1,800 metres (5,900 ft) above sea level, mostly in caves. The wingspan is 4–4.5 centimetres (1.6–1.8 in). 29 August 2013
