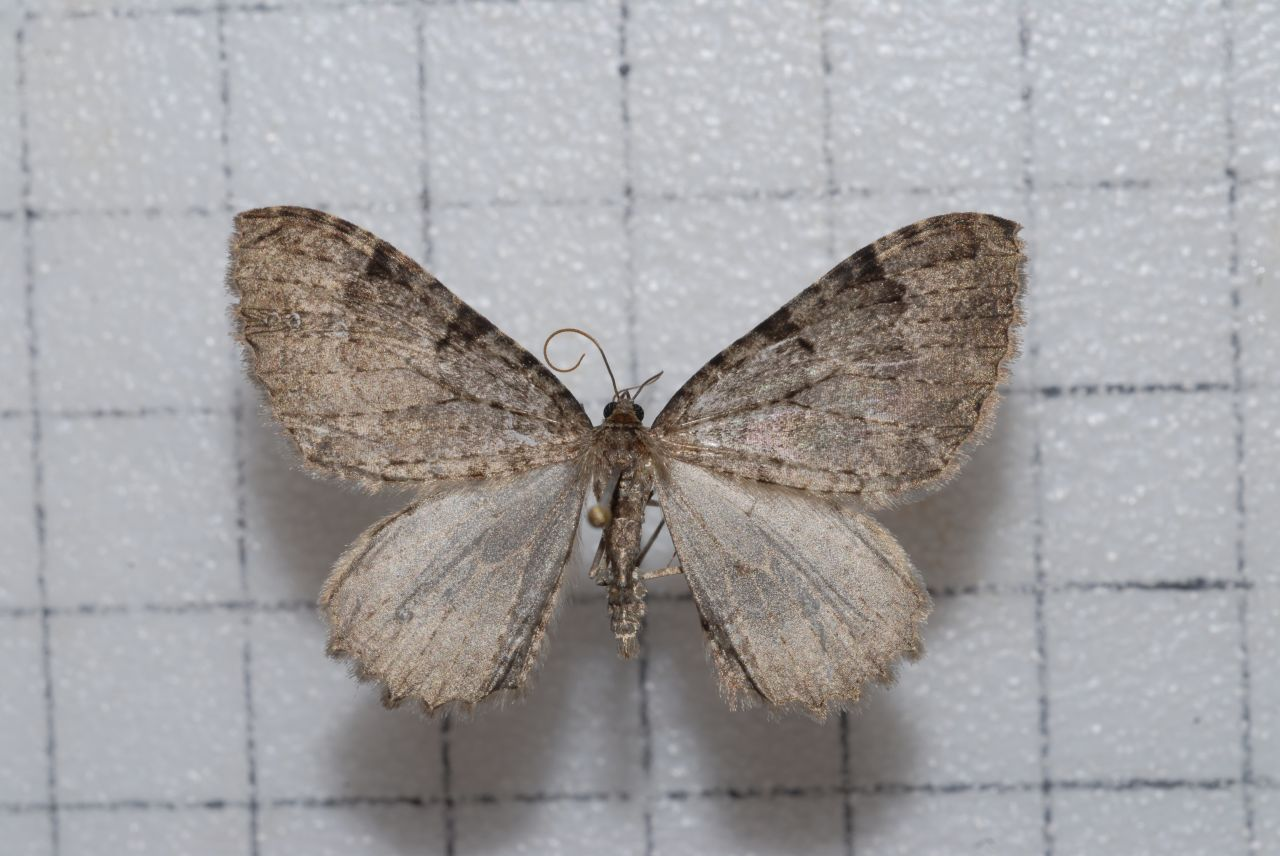

Scientific classification
- Kingdom: Animalia
- Phylum: Arthropoda
- Class: Insecta
- Order: Lepidoptera
- Family: Geometridae
- Genus: Triphosa
- Species: T. rantaizanensis

Binomial name
- Triphosa rantaizanensis Wileman, 1916

= Triphosa rantaizanensis =

Species of moth

Triphosa rantaizanensis is a species of moth of the family Geometridae that is endemic to Taiwan.

The wingspan is 41–45 millimetres (1.6–1.8 in).
