= Triphosa californiata =

Scientific classification
- Kingdom: Animalia
- Phylum: Arthropoda
- Clade: Pancrustacea
- Class: Insecta
- Order: Lepidoptera
- Family: Geometridae
- Genus: Triphosa
- Species: T. californiata

Binomial name
- Triphosa californiata (Packard, 1871)

Species of moth

Triphosa californiata is a species of geometrid moth in the family Geometridae. It is found in North America.

The MONA or Hodges number for Triphosa californiata is 7287.
