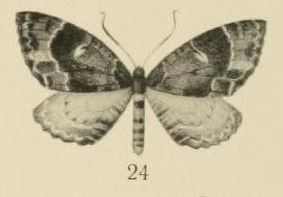
- Triphosa tritocelidata

Scientific classification
- Kingdom: Animalia
- Phylum: Arthropoda
- Clade: Pancrustacea
- Class: Insecta
- Order: Lepidoptera
- Family: Geometridae
- Subfamily: Larentiinae
- Tribe: Rheumapterini
- Genus: Triphosa; Stephens, 1829

Synonyms
- Strepsizuga Warren, 1908; Umbrosina Bruand, 1847; Speluncaris Bruand, 1847

= Triphosa =

Genus of moths

Triphosa is a genus of moths in the family Geometridae, subfamily Larentiinae. The genus was first described by Stephens in 1829. The larvae or caterpillars are commonly called meters, hence the name of the family. These species in Colombia are little known and studied, in addition to the inclusion of its high rate of species.

Some plants associated with this genus of moth are: Rhamnus (Rhamnaceae), Prunus (Rosaceae).

== Species ==
Species include:

- Triphosa atrifascia Inoue, 2004
- Triphosa bipectinata Barnes & McDunnough, 1917
- Triphosa californiata (Packard, 1871)
- Triphosa dubitata Linnaeus, 1758
- Triphosa haesitata (Guenée in Boisduval & Guenée, 1858)
- Triphosa lugens Bastelberger, 1909
- Triphosa praesumtiosa Prout, 1941
- Triphosa quasiplaga Dyar, 1913
- Triphosa rantaizanensis Wileman, 1916
- Triphosa rotundata Inoue, 2004
- Triphosa rubrifusa Bastelberger, 1909
- Triphosa sabaudiata (Duponchel, 1830)
- Triphosa tritocelidata Aurivillius, 1910
- Triphosa umbraria (Leech, 1891)
