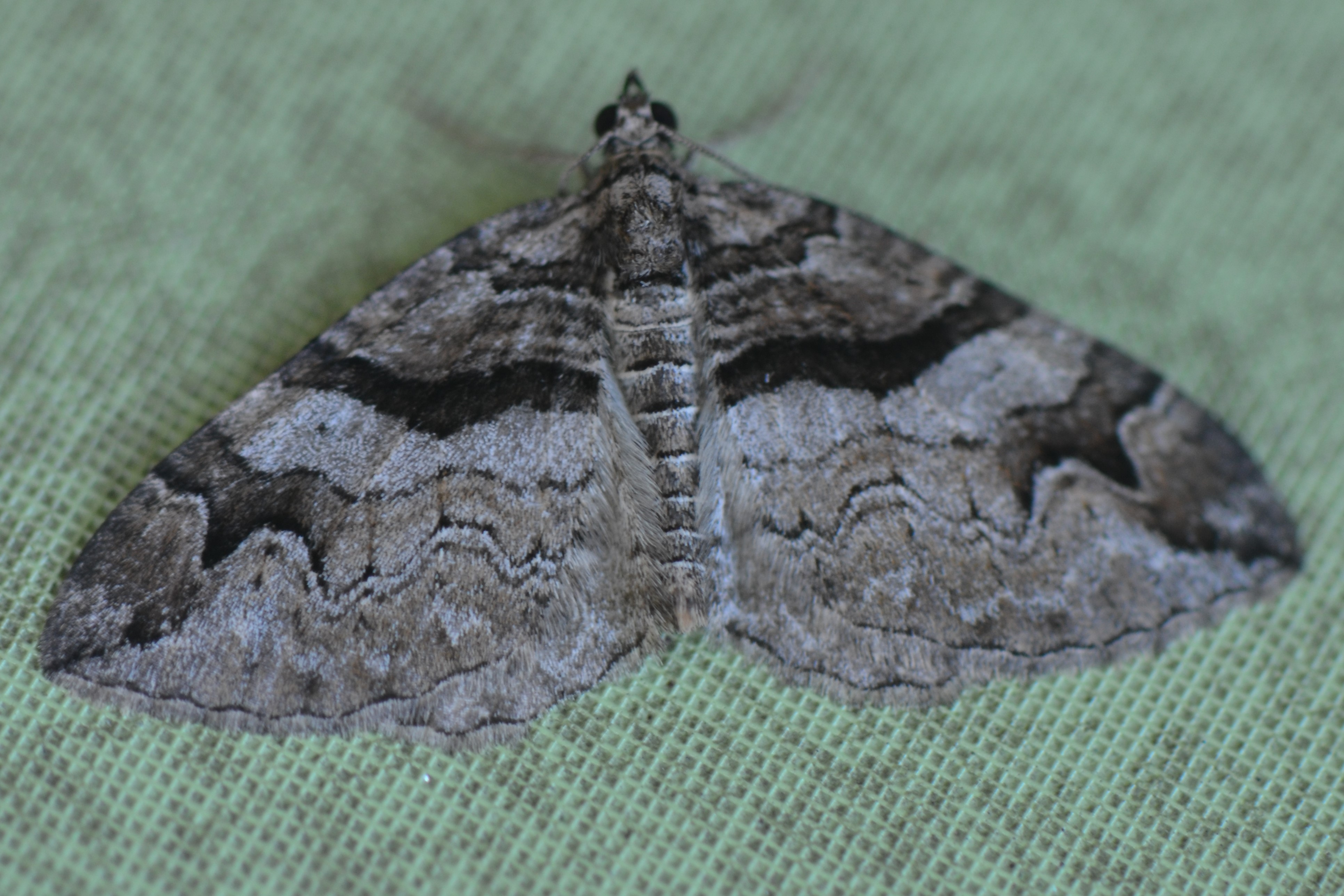

Scientific classification
- Kingdom: Animalia
- Phylum: Arthropoda
- Clade: Pancrustacea
- Class: Insecta
- Order: Lepidoptera
- Family: Geometridae
- Genus: Pareulype
- Species: P. berberata

Binomial name
- Pareulype berberata (Denis & Schiffermüller, 1775)

Synonyms
- List: Geometra berberata Denis & Schiffermuller, 1775; Pareulype cinerea Herbulot, 1977

= Pareulype berberata =

Species of moth

Pareulype berberata, the barberry carpet moth, is a moth of the family Geometridae. The species was first described by Austrian lepidopterists, Michael Denis and Ignaz Schiffermüller in 1775. The moth is found in Africa, Asia and Europe.

== Subspecies ==
Subspecies include:

- Pareulype berberata berberata
- Pareulype berberata maindroni Herbulot, 1977
- Pareulype berberata sineliturata Culot, 1919

== Distribution ==
This species can be found in most of Europe (Austria, Balearic Islands, Belgium, British Islands, Bulgaria, Central European Russia, Croatia, Czech Republic, Denmark, France, Germany, Hungary, Italy, Latvia, Lithuania, Luxembourg, Poland, Romania, Slovakia, Slovenia, Spain, Sweden, Switzerland, The Netherlands and Ukraine), in the Near East and North Africa.

== Habitat ==
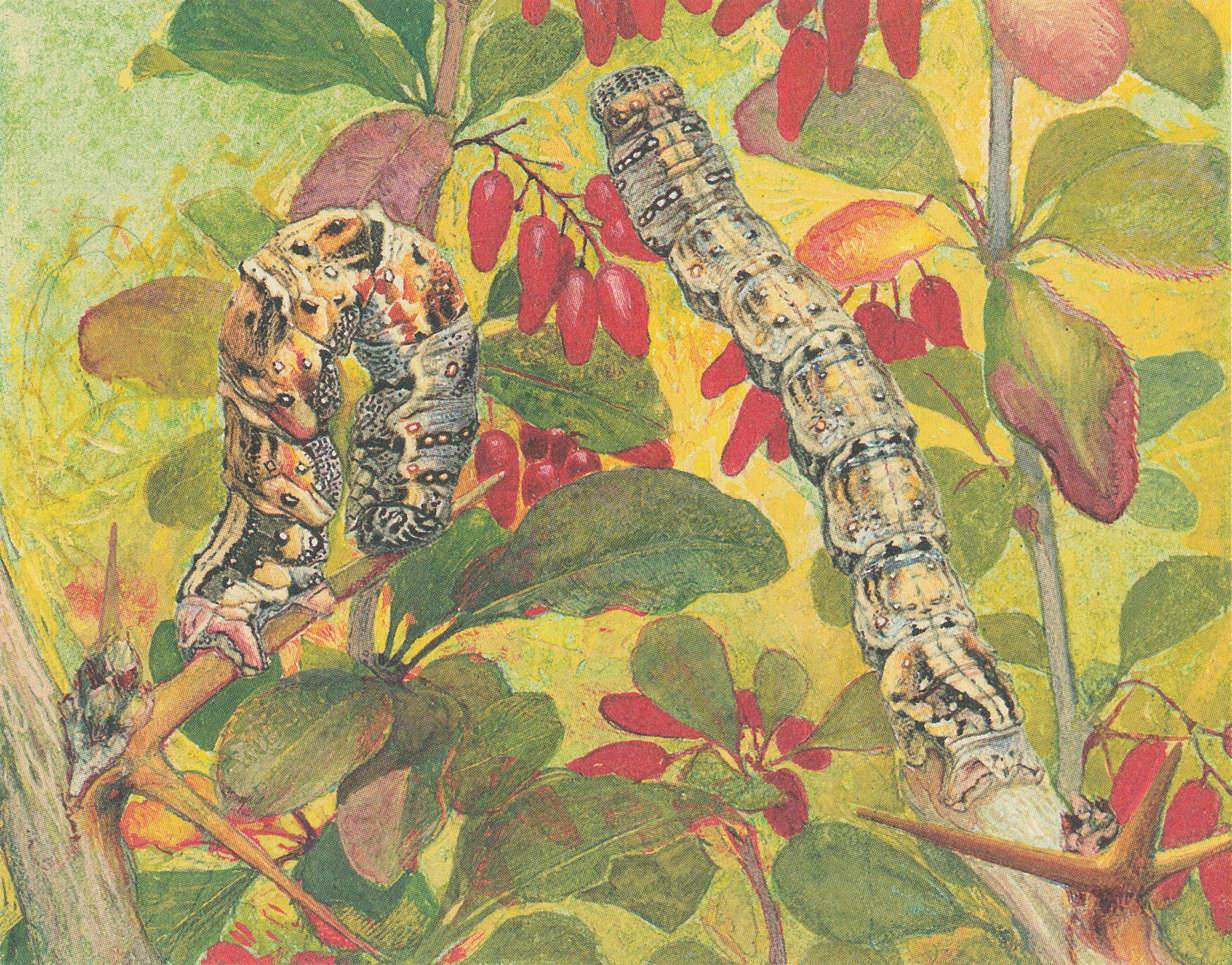
Illustration of caterpillars

These moths are silvicolous and they mainly occur in deciduous, mixed and coniferous forest, clearings and warm slopes, at an elevation up to 1,000–1,500 metres (3,300–4,900 ft) above sea level.

== Description ==
Pareulype berberata has a wingspan of 27–32 mm. Antennae are filiform. Forewings show greyish ground colour, with dark brown and ash brown trasversal wavy bands. Hindwings are pale and unmarked. The larvae are brown, usually with a wavy white line on the sides.

== Biology ==
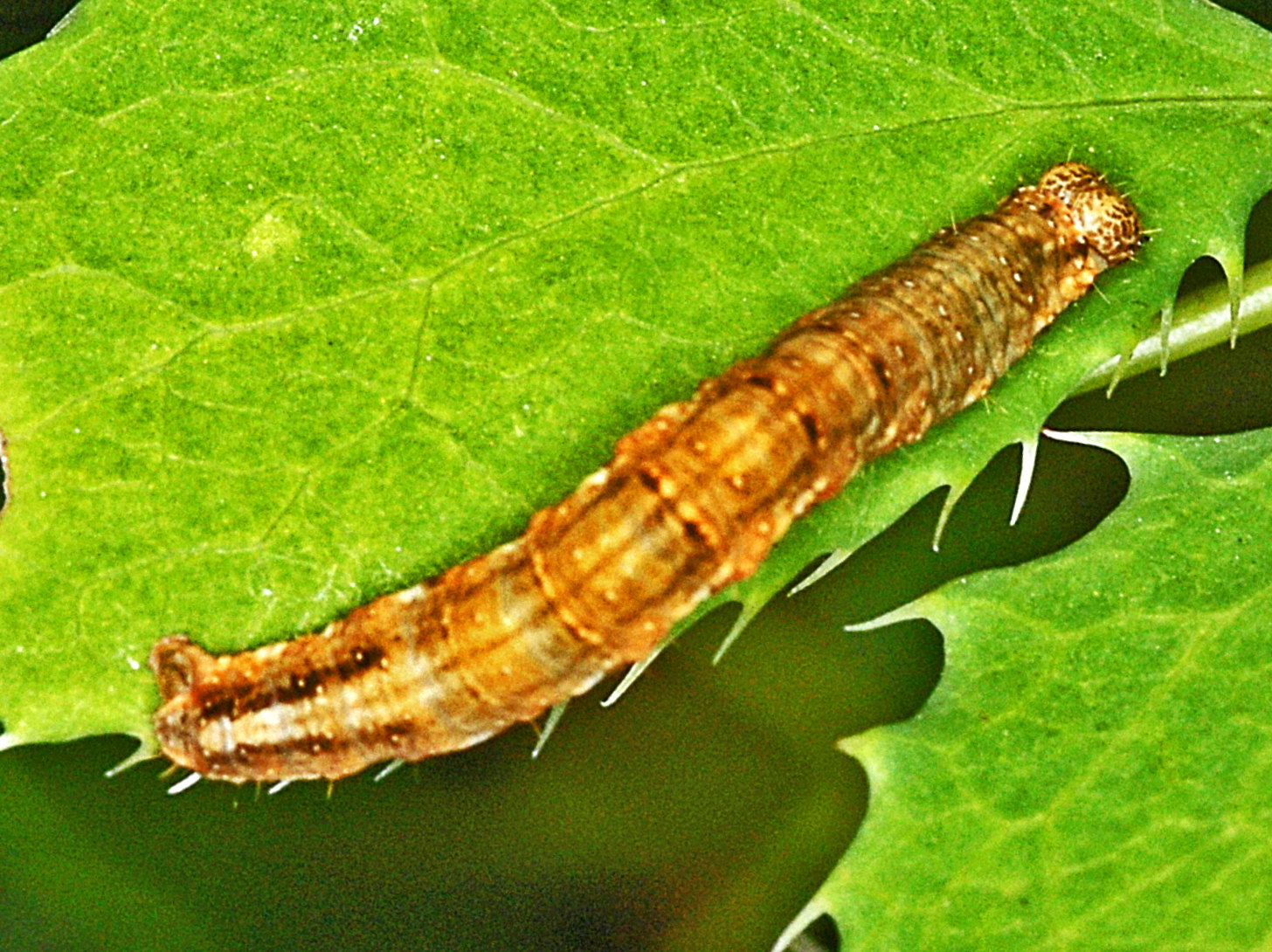
Caterpillar

There are two generations per year, as this species is bivoltine. Adults emerge from May to June and again in August. The second generation pupate in the ground approximately at the end of September. The pupa overwinters. The larvae feed on barberry shrubs (Berberis) from July to October.

== Human relevance ==
Barberry bushes, on which the larva exclusively feed, were mostly eliminated by farmers in the United Kingdom because they can act as a host to a rust fungus that also infects wheat. Rust resistant wheat was developed, but not before the barberry shrub disappeared from most of Britain. The barberry carpet moth declined in parallel with the decline of the bushes until only around ten colonies were left in England.

One of the Back from the Brink conservation projects, some barberry carpet moths were reared in captivity and after the barberry shrub was reintroduced to 169 sites, captive moths were released and are now found at several locations throughout southern and central England. The programme was managed by the Barberry Highways Group, including Chester Zoo, Dudley Zoo, British Waterways, Drayton Manor Theme Park, West Leeds Country Park and Butterfly Conservation.
