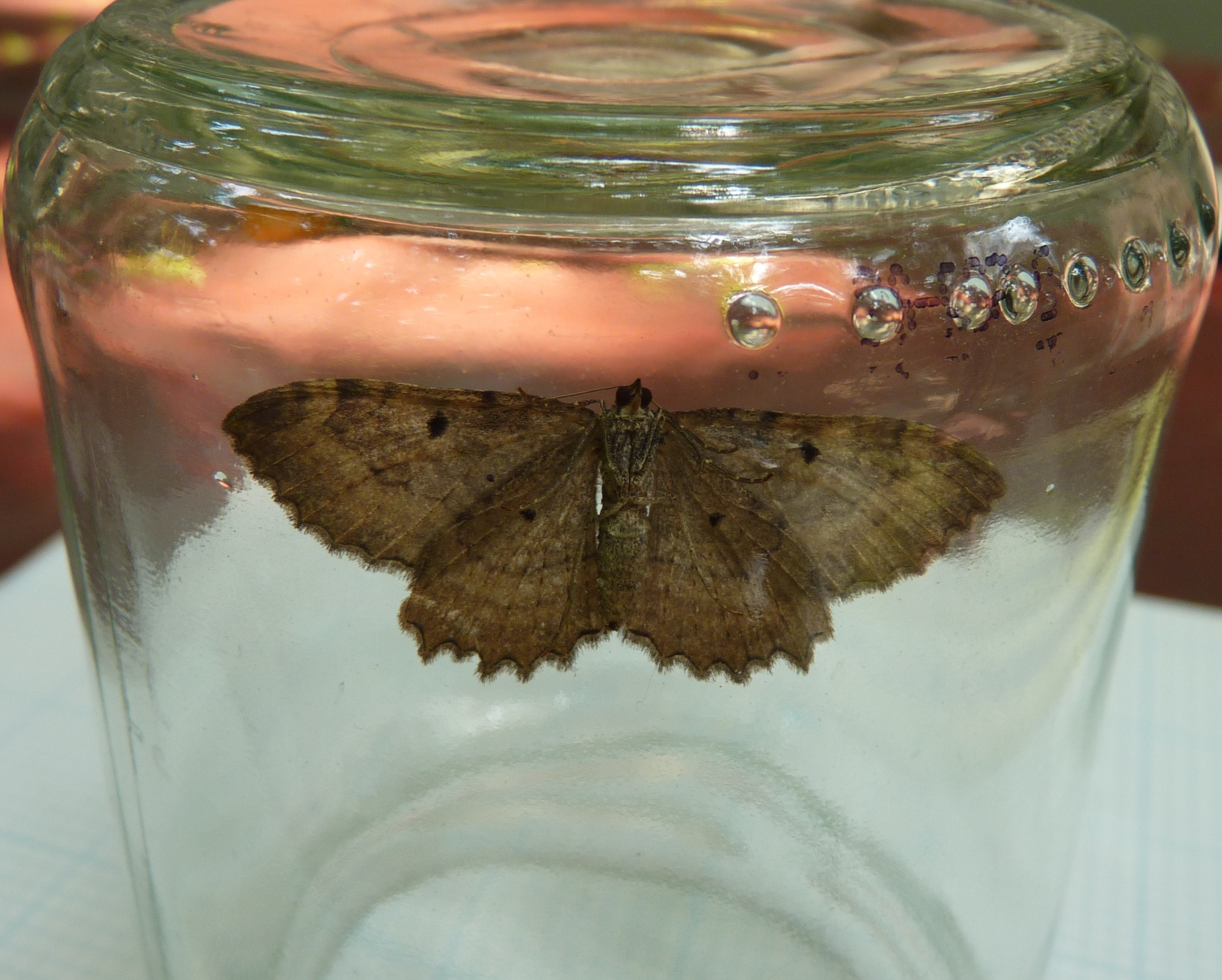

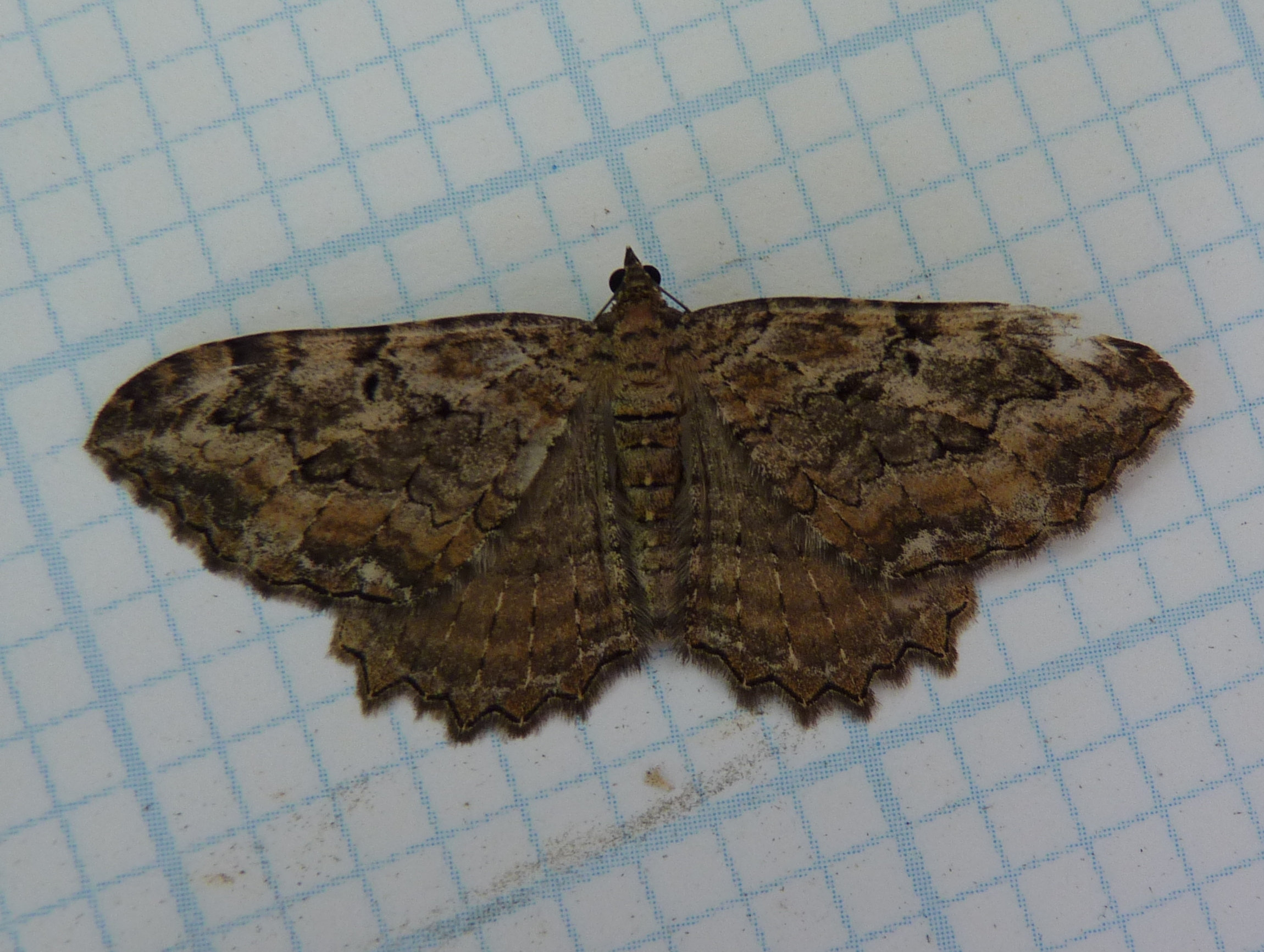

Scientific classification
- Kingdom: Animalia
- Phylum: Arthropoda
- Clade: Pancrustacea
- Class: Insecta
- Order: Lepidoptera
- Family: Geometridae
- Subfamily: Larentiinae
- Tribe: Rheumapterini
- Genus: Coryphista; Hulst, 1896
- Species: C. meadii

Binomial name
- Coryphista meadii (Packard, 1874)

Synonyms
- Scotosia meadii Packard, 1874; Rheumaptera meadii; Coryphista badiaria (H. Edwards, 1885) (form); Coryphista optimata (Strecker, 1899); Coryphista meadii atlantica Munroe, 1954; Coryphista meadii fumosa Comstock, 1967

= Coryphista =

Genus of moths

Coryphista is a monotypic genus of moths in the family Geometridae erected by George Duryea Hulst in 1896. The genus may be considered to be a synonym of Rheumaptera. Its only species, Coryphista meadii, the barberry geometer moth or barberry looper, was first described by Alpheus Spring Packard in 1874. It is found in the United States and southern Canada.

The wingspan is 30–36 mm.

Adults are on wing from April to October. There are several generations per year.

The caterpillar has a dark brown body, with a reddish-brown head and a broad white spiracular stripe, with shades of yellow or red about the spiracles. Mature larvae are 2.5 cm long. It spends the winter as a pupa in a cell under the soil.

The larvae feed on Berberis species (barberries), an introduced shrub in most of eastern North America.

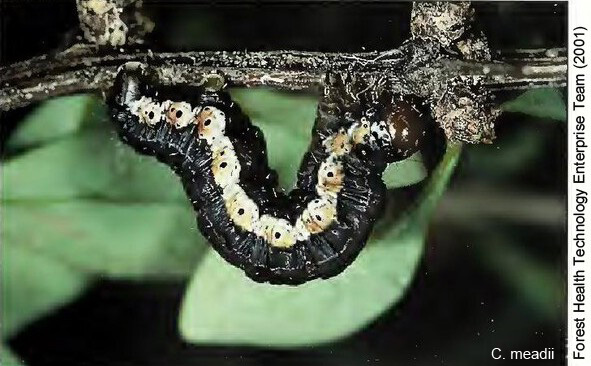
Coryphista meadii caterpillar
