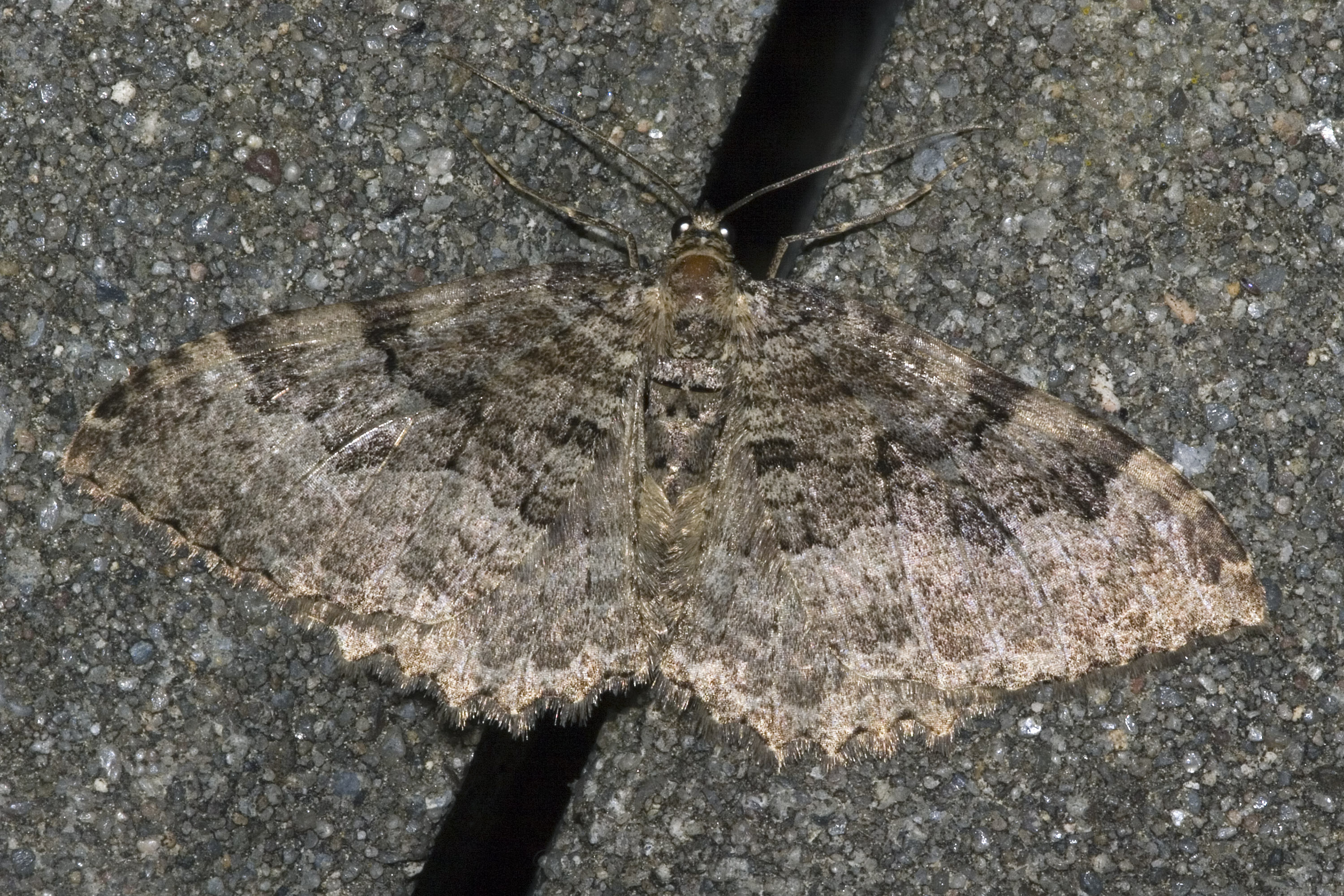

Scientific classification
- Kingdom: Animalia
- Phylum: Arthropoda
- Clade: Pancrustacea
- Class: Insecta
- Order: Lepidoptera
- Family: Geometridae
- Genus: Rheumaptera
- Species: R. cervinalis

Binomial name
- Rheumaptera cervinalis (Scopoli, 1763)

Synonyms
- [?] Hydria cervinalis (Scopoli, 1763)

= Rheumaptera cervinalis =

Species of moth

Rheumaptera cervinalis or Hydria cervinalis (in some schemes), the scarce tissue, is a moth of the genus Rheumaptera in the family Geometridae. It is found across the Palearctic.

Approximately 40–48 mm in wingspan. Similar to Triphosa dubitata, but fore-wing slightly narrower and more pointed, rather rough textured, and not marked with pink. Central cross-lines closer together, often merged, usually blackish brown. Hind-wing is irregularly saw-toothed rather than scalloped. On the underside, small dark central spots bold and intense; two small dark spots near base of the fore-wing on leading edge.

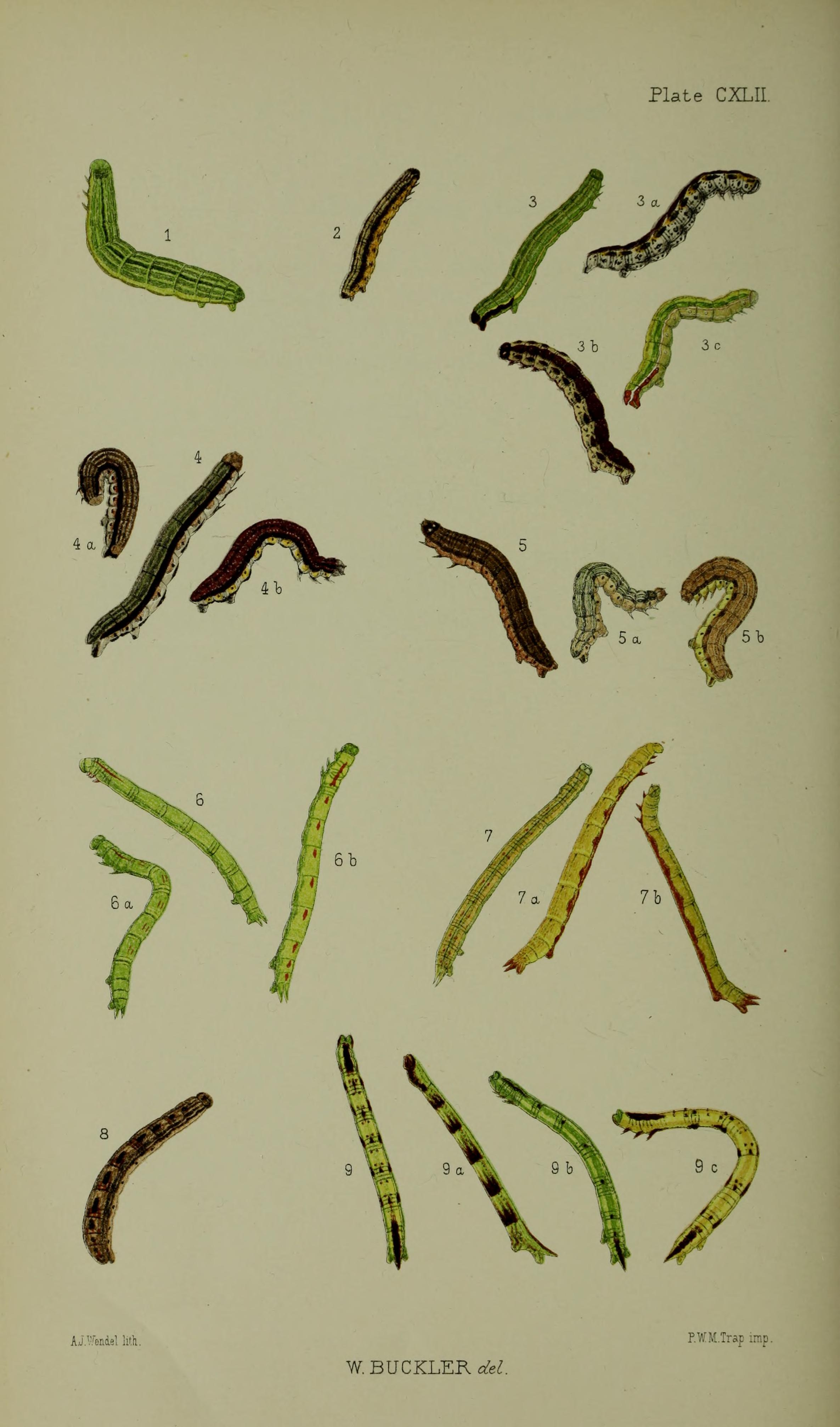
Figs 4, 4a, 4b larvae in various stages

The larva is powerful with short white bristles. The dorsum is dark grey, the abdomen pale, on the sides it has yellow spots.

Flying season is April–June. The larvae feed on Berberis spp. Habitat is hedgerows, gardens, parkland and other urban situations.
