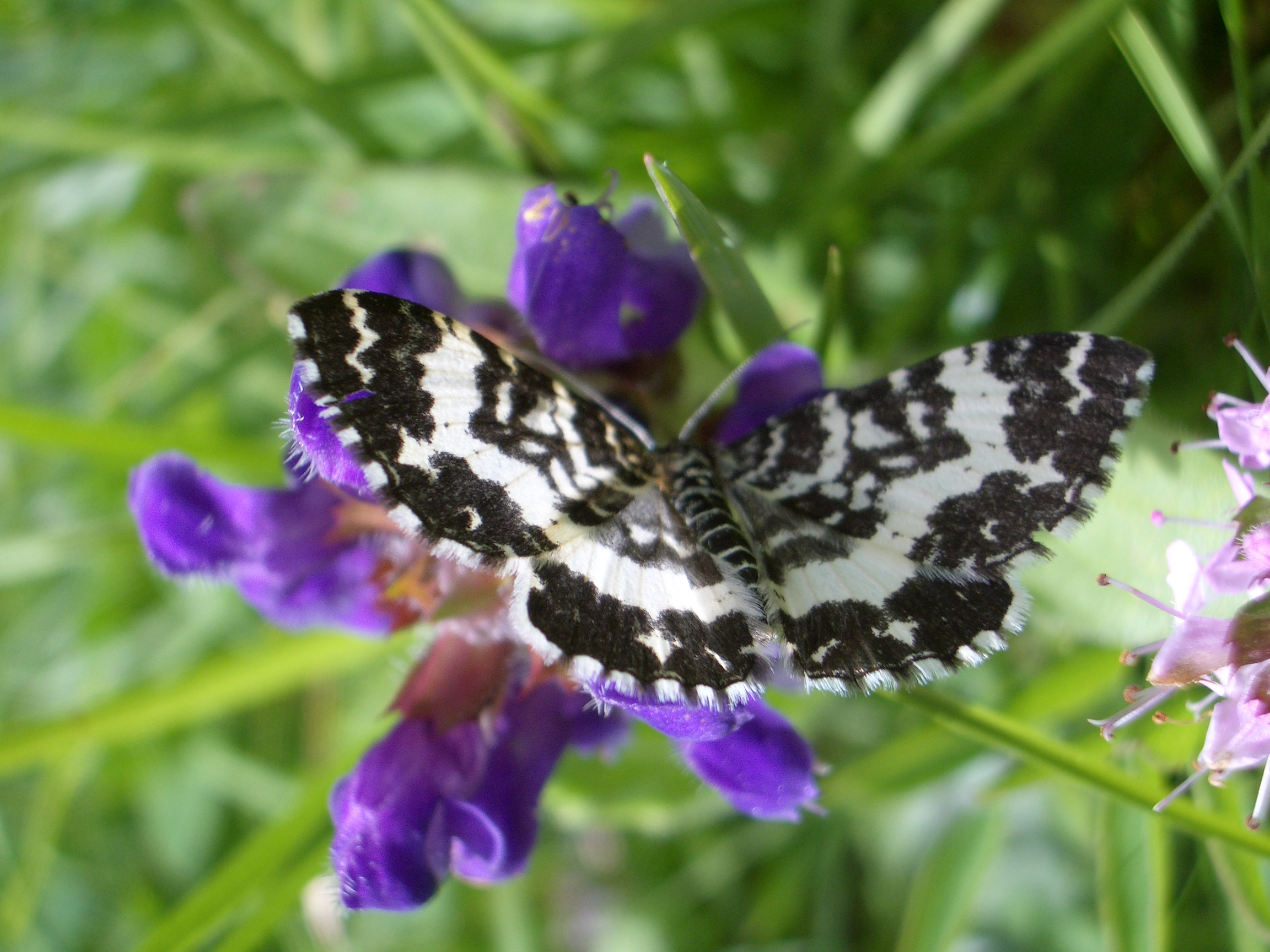
- Rheumaptera hastata in the Julian Alps of Slovenia

Scientific classification
- Kingdom: Animalia
- Phylum: Arthropoda
- Clade: Pancrustacea
- Class: Insecta
- Order: Lepidoptera
- Family: Geometridae
- Subfamily: Larentiinae
- Tribe: Rheumapterini

= Rheumapterini =

Tribe of moths

Rheumapterini is a tribe of geometer moths under subfamily Larentiinae.

== Genera ==
- Coryphista Hulst, 1896
- Euriphosa
- Hospitalia Agenjo, 1950
- Hydria Hübner, 1822
- Pareulype Herbulot, 1951
- Rheumaptera Hübner, 1822
- Triphosa Stephens, 1829
- Xenospora
