= Triphosa bipectinata =

Scientific classification
- Kingdom: Animalia
- Phylum: Arthropoda
- Class: Insecta
- Order: Lepidoptera
- Family: Geometridae
- Genus: Triphosa
- Species: T. bipectinata

Binomial name
- Triphosa bipectinata Barnes & McDunnough, 1917

Species of moth

Triphosa bipectinata is a species of moth in the family Geometridae first described by William Barnes and James Halliday McDunnough in 1917. It is found in North America.

The MONA or Hodges number for Triphosa bipectinata is 7288.
