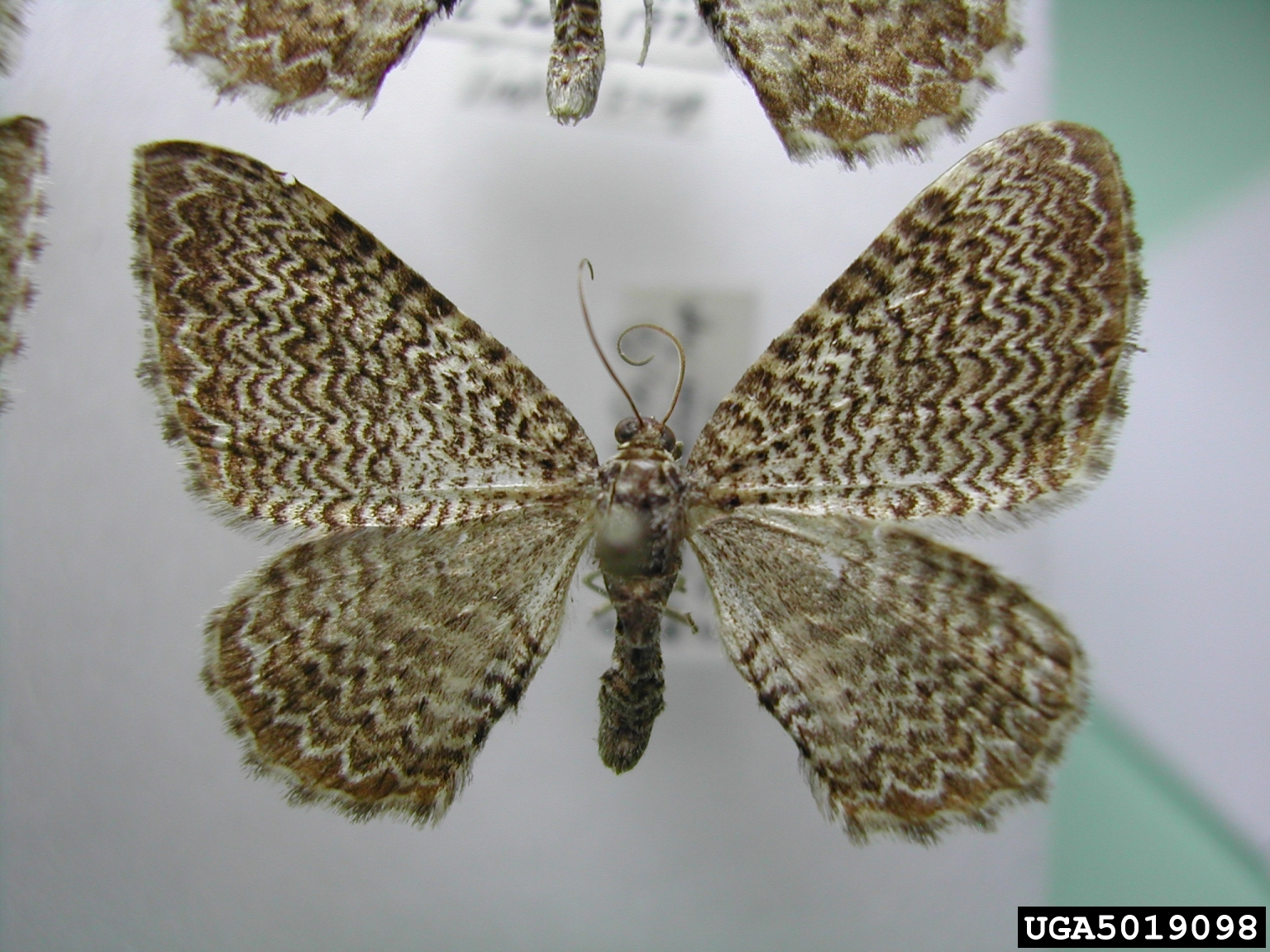

Scientific classification
- Kingdom: Animalia
- Phylum: Arthropoda
- Clade: Pancrustacea
- Class: Insecta
- Order: Lepidoptera
- Family: Geometridae
- Genus: Rheumaptera
- Species: R. prunivorata

Binomial name
- Rheumaptera prunivorata Ferguson, 1955

Synonyms
- [?] Hydria prunivorata

= Rheumaptera prunivorata =

Species of moth

Rheumaptera prunivorata or Hydria prunivorata (in some schemes), the cherry scallop shell or Ferguson's scallop shell, is a moth of the family Geometridae. The species was first described by Alexander Douglas Campbell Ferguson in 1955. It is found in North America from New Brunswick, Quebec and Ontario in Canada, through the eastern parts of the United States, down to Georgia.

The wingspan is about 35 mm. The moth flies from May to September depending on the location.

The larvae feed on Prunus virginiana.

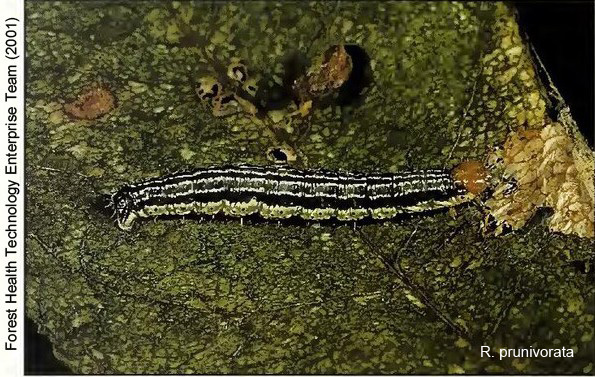
Rheumaptera prunivorata caterpillar
