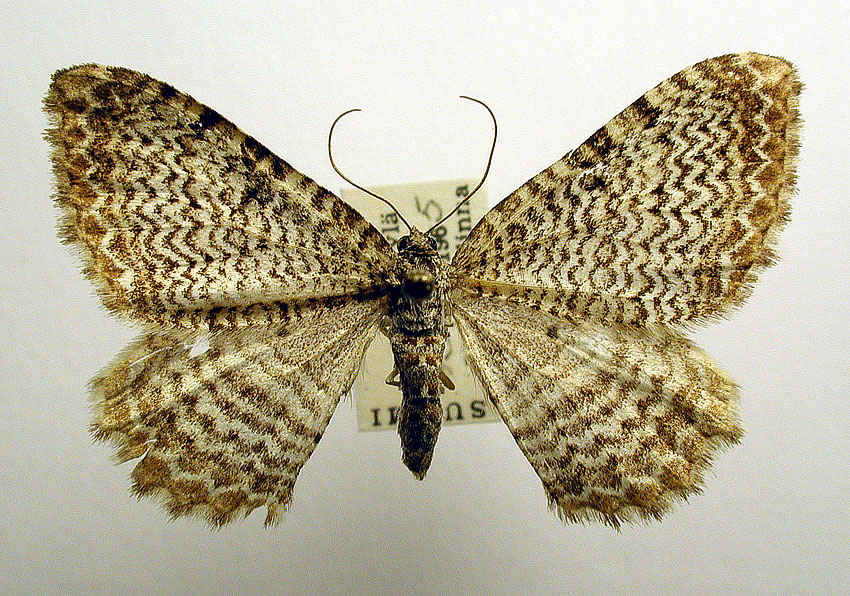

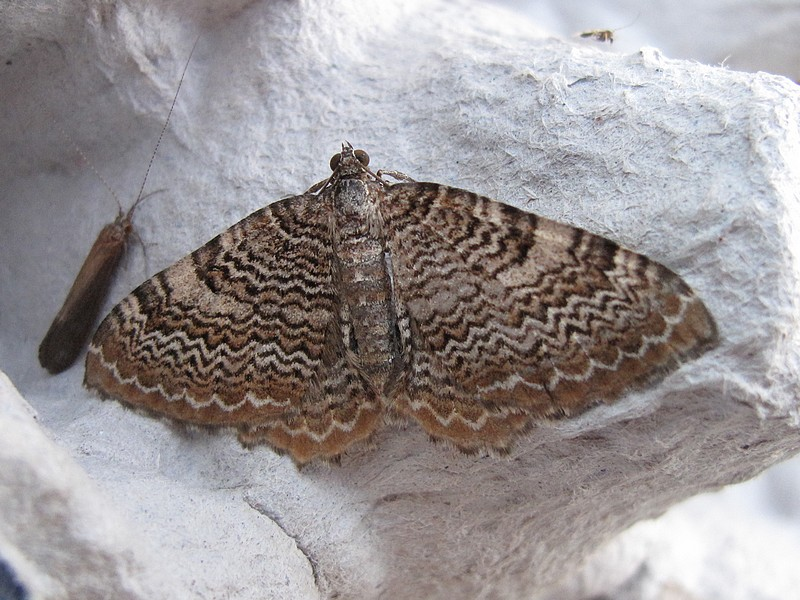

Scientific classification
- Kingdom: Animalia
- Phylum: Arthropoda
- Clade: Pancrustacea
- Class: Insecta
- Order: Lepidoptera
- Family: Geometridae
- Genus: Rheumaptera
- Species: R. undulata

Binomial name
- Rheumaptera undulata (Linnaeus, 1758)

Synonyms
- Phalaena undulata Linnaeus, 1758; [?] Hydria undulata (Linnaeus, 1758)

= Rheumaptera undulata =

Species of moth

Rheumaptera undulata or Hydria undulata (in some schemes), the scallop shell, is a moth of the family Geometridae. It was first described by Carl Linnaeus in his 1758 10th edition of Systema Naturae. It is found in most of the Palearctic realm and North America.

The main habitat is light quarry and floodplain forests, bushy forest edges as well as gardens and park landscapes. In the Alps, the species rises to heights of 1500 metres.

The wingspan is 25–30 mm. The ground colour of the forewings is pale. The crosslines are darker, wavy, evenly spaced and numerous. The outer margin is pale brown with a scalloped fringe. The hindwings resemble the forewings but are paler.

== Larvae ==
The larva is relatively powerful, naked except for some short white bristles. It creates a "lonely" shelter by spinning a single leaf (or a small cluster of shoot tips) together with silk. The dorsum is light to dark grey, with narrow white longitudinal stripes. The venter is pale.

There is one generation per year with adults on wing from the end of May to August in Europe. Larvae can be found in August and September. It overwinters as a pupa.

== Host Plants ==
The larvae feed on birch (including Betula verrucosa and B. pubescens), Vaccinium (including V. myrtillus and V. uliginosum) and willow species (including Salix myrtilloides, S. caprea, S. aurita, S. cinerea, S. myrsinifolia and S. phylicifolia), as well as aspen (Populus tremula), Populus balsamifera, Berberis vulgaris, Ribes alpinum, Spiraea salicifolia, rowan (Sorbus aucuparia), Elaeagnus commutata and Myrica gale.

== Subspecies ==
- Rheumaptera undulata bluff (Bryk, 1921)
- Rheumaptera undulata sajana Bryk, 1921
- Rheumaptera undulata undulata Linnaeus, 1758

== Gallery ==
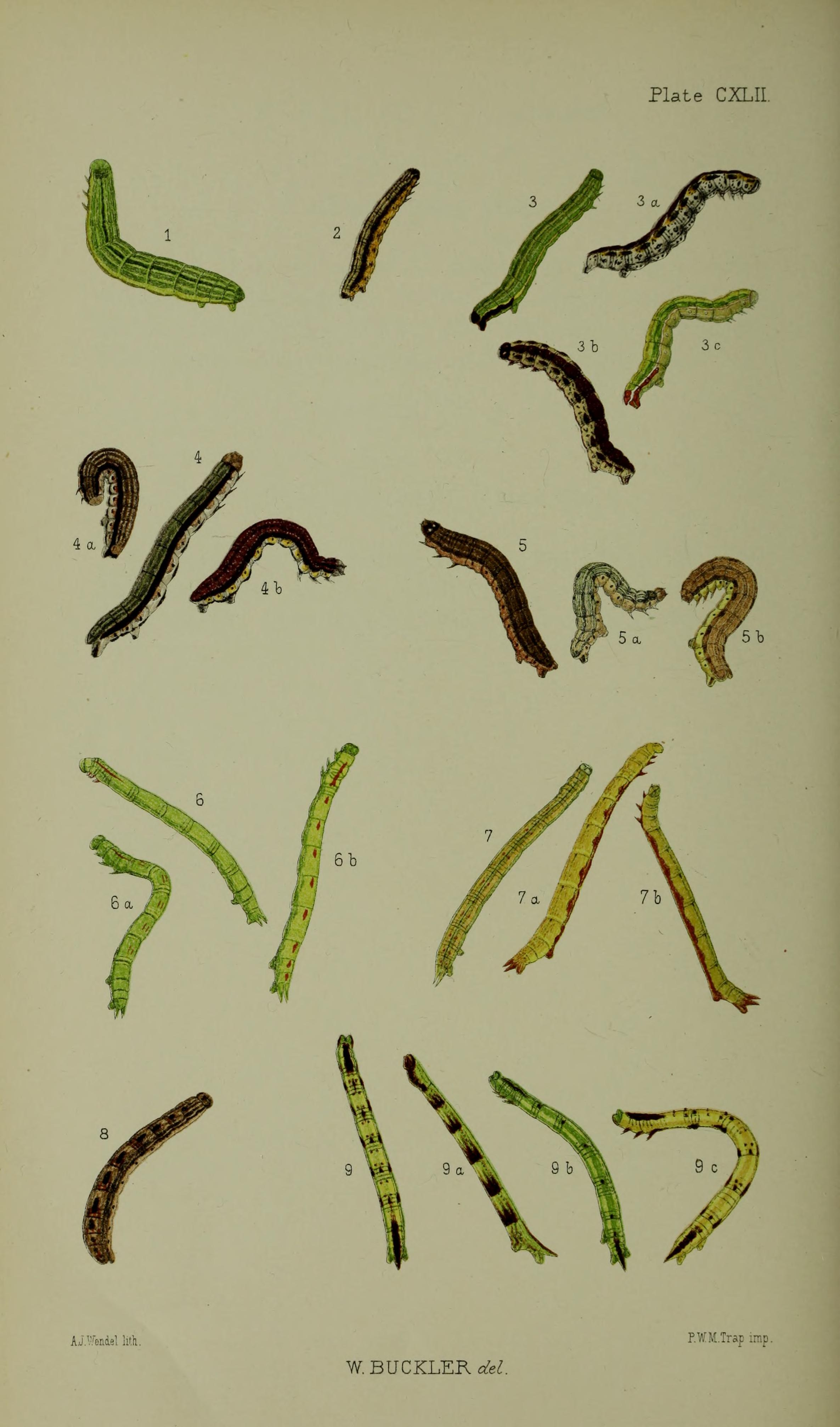
Larvae in various stages (Figs 5, 5a, 5b)

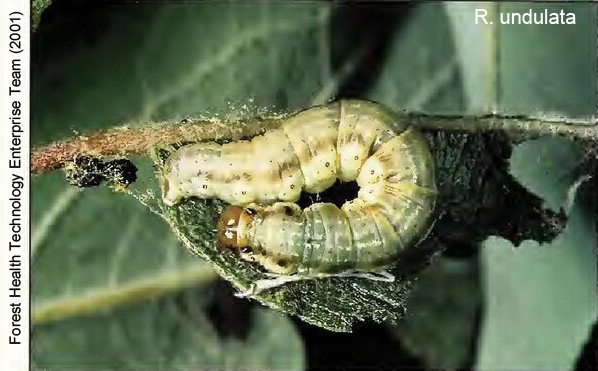
Rheumaptera undulata caterpillar

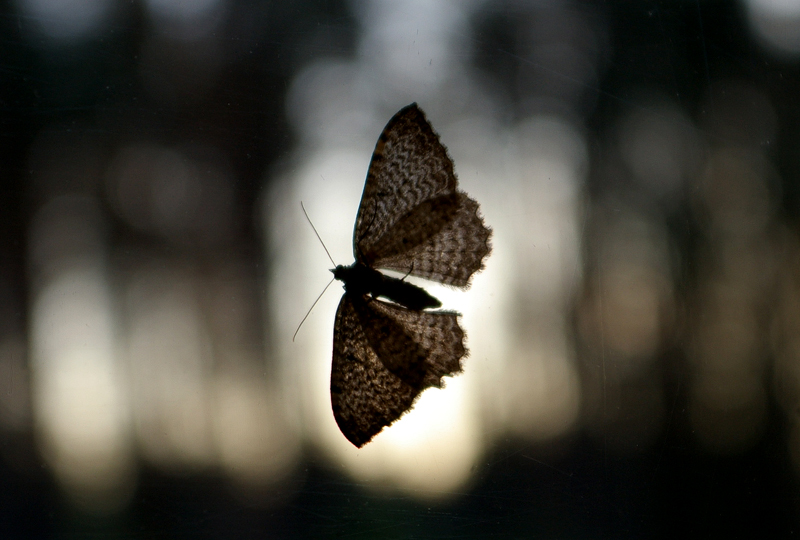
R. undulata
