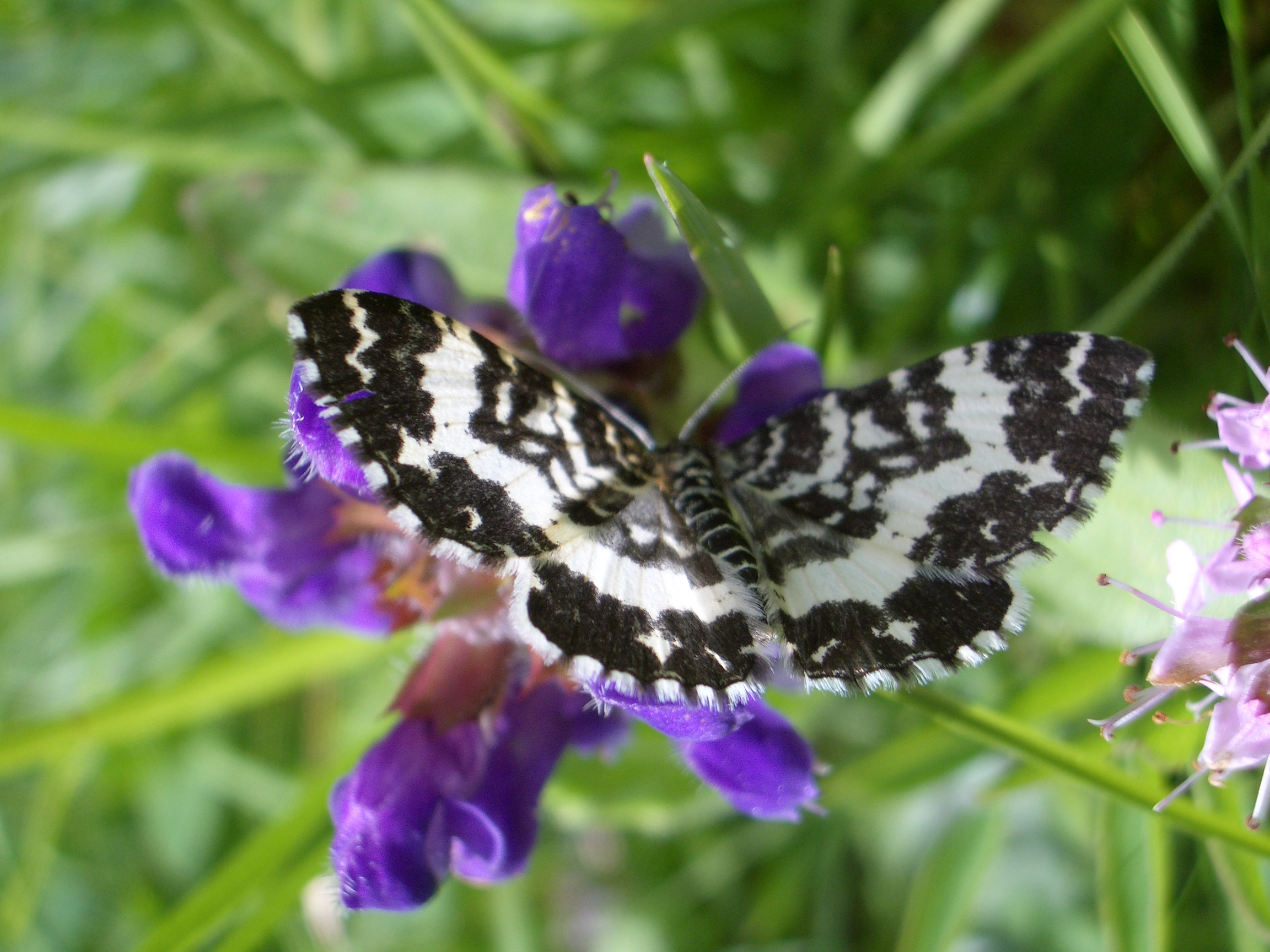
- In the Julian Alps of Slovenia

Scientific classification
- Kingdom: Animalia
- Phylum: Arthropoda
- Clade: Pancrustacea
- Class: Insecta
- Order: Lepidoptera
- Family: Geometridae
- Genus: Rheumaptera
- Species: R. hastata

Binomial name
- Rheumaptera hastata (Linnaeus, 1758)

= Argent and sable =

Rheumaptera hastata

Species of moth

The argent and sable moth (Rheumaptera hastata) is a day-flying moth of the family Geometridae, with distinctive black and white colors. They tend to live on wetlands and hillsides. The larvae spin together the leaves of their food plants (such as birch and bog myrtle) to form their cocoons. It was named argent and sable in 1778. Argent and sable refer to the heraldic color names for white and black. Their distribution is Holarctic. The species was first described by Carl Linnaeus in his 1758 10th edition of Systema Naturae.

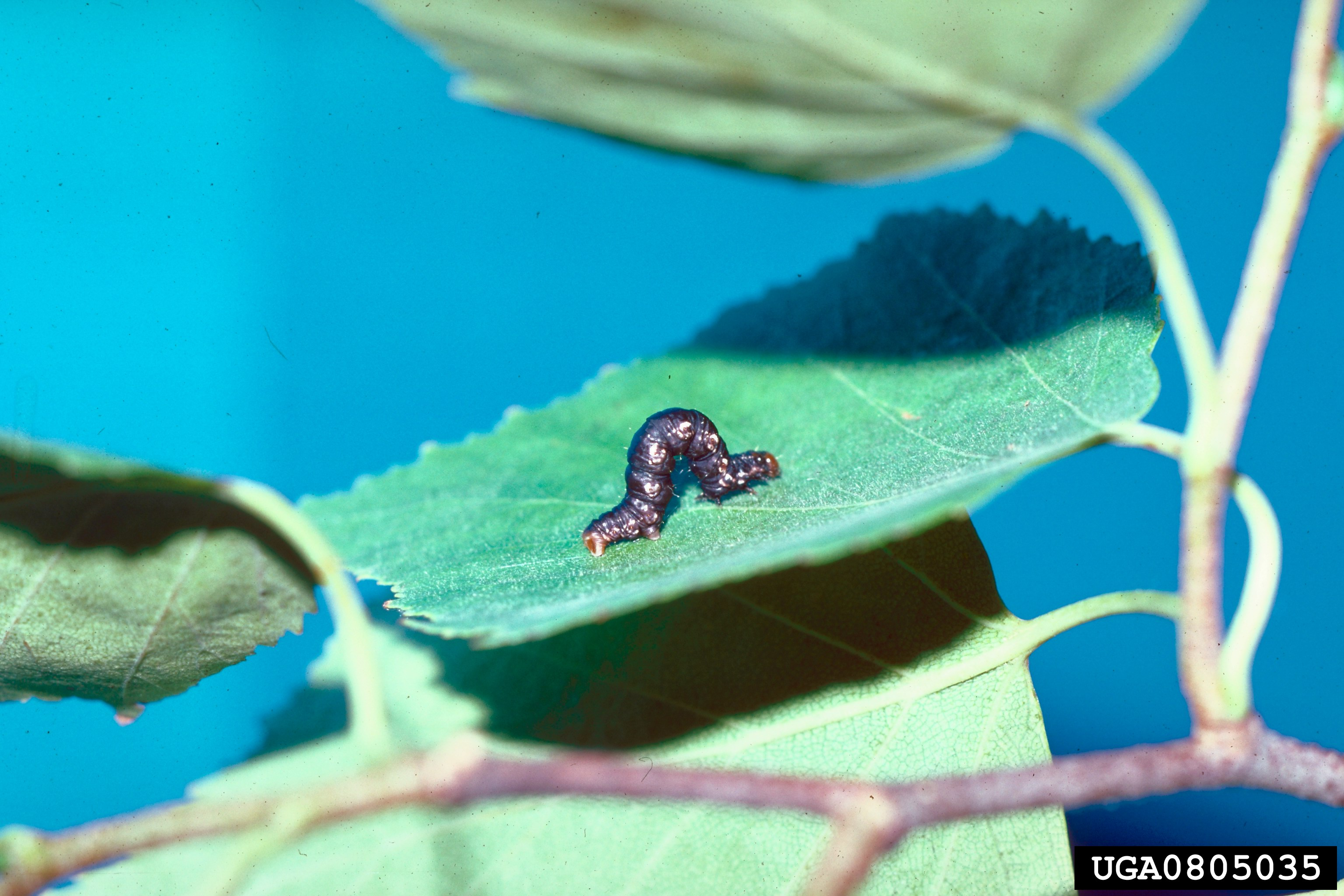
Caterpillar

== Distribution ==
The species occurs in almost all parts of Europe. The distribution area stretches over northern Asia to the Russian Far East and large parts of China on to Japan. The species occurs in large parts of North America. Currently three subspecies are distinguished Rheumaptera hastata hastata, Rheumaptera hastata nigrescens and Rheumaptera hastata thulearia.

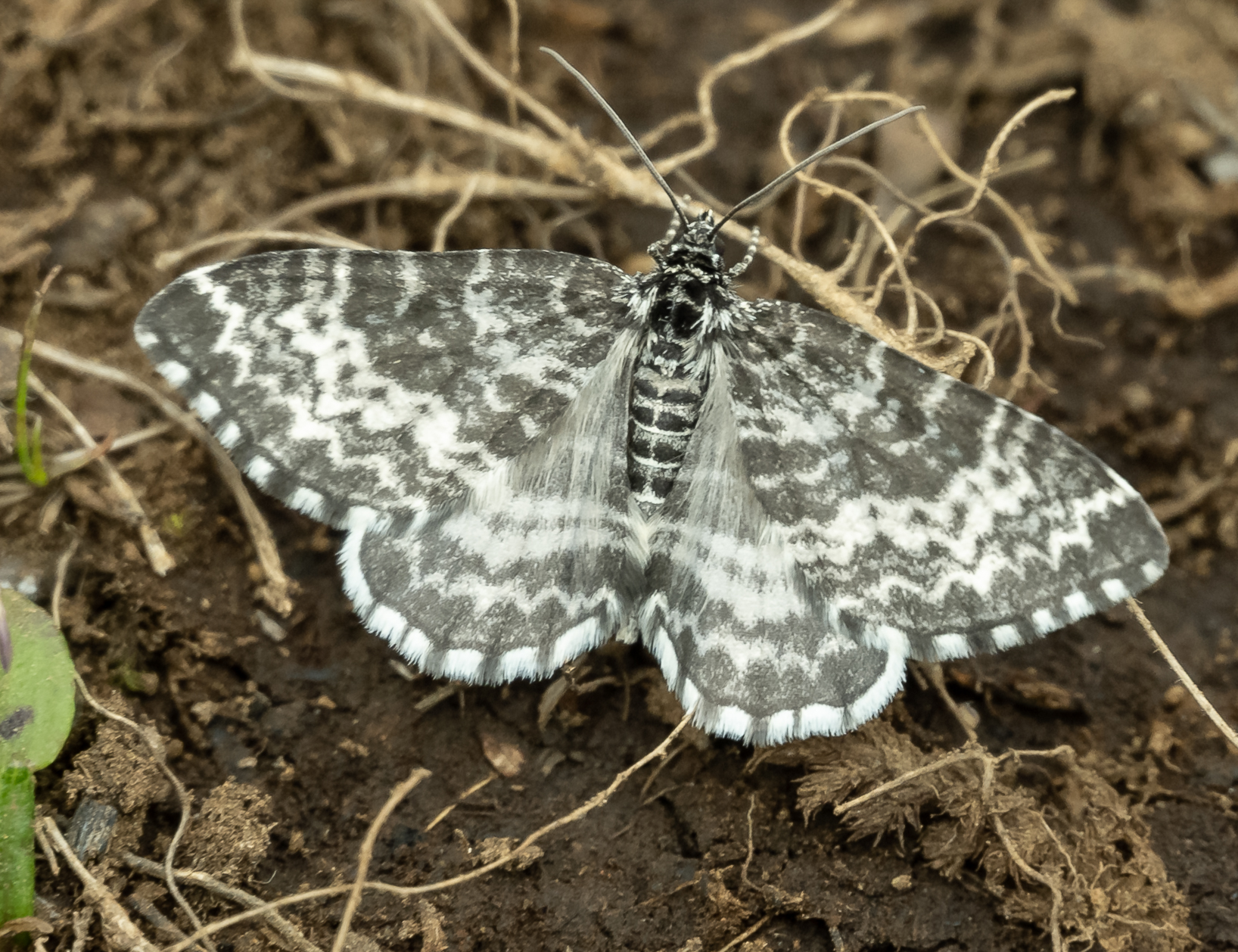
Subspecies thulearia

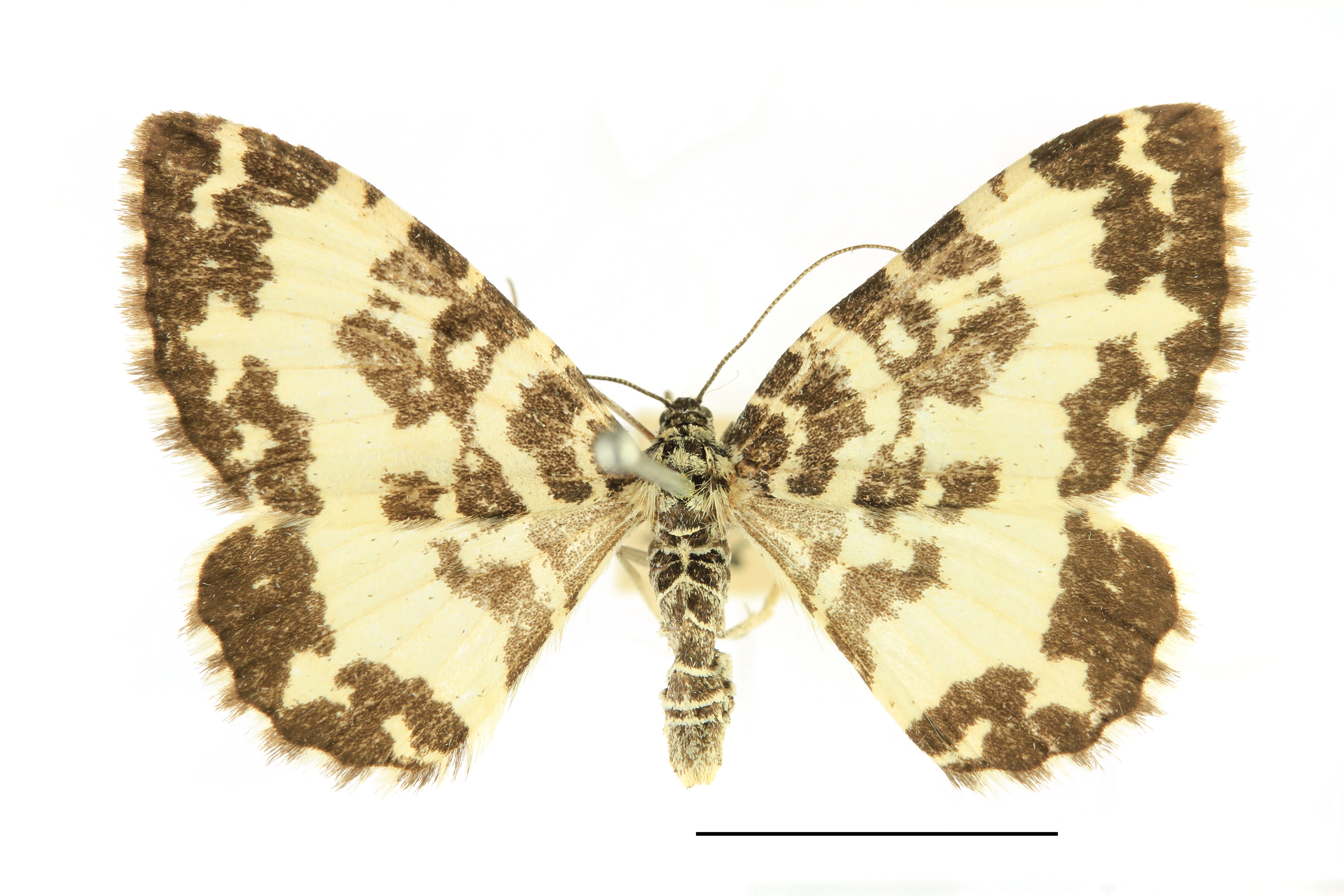
Museum specimen

== Description ==
The wings have a black ground color with variable white pattern elements. A wider inner cross and a narrow basal cross line are typical. The dark midfield is traversed by white patches, which may be continuous. The outer cross line forms a wide white band, which usually has a row of black dots. In the black area of the margin is a wavy line broken into white stains, which forms an arrow- or spearhead-shaped element (R. hastata is Latin for spear shaped). The fringes are black and white patched. The pattern of the hindwing is similar to the forewing. In some forms the black tone is reduced on a few black stains.

== Variation ==
R. hastata is extremely variable and splits up into several local races. The nominotypical subspecies R. h. hastata form is large, with the median band strongly broken behind the middle, and intensely black markings. Form laxata Krulik has the white areas still further widened, the postmedian band much broader than usual, the black median markings narrowed and broken, and no black dots in the postmedian band. Form demolita Prout is a more extreme form, the black median band only remaining as a small patch on the discocellulars and a small one at the hindmargin.
