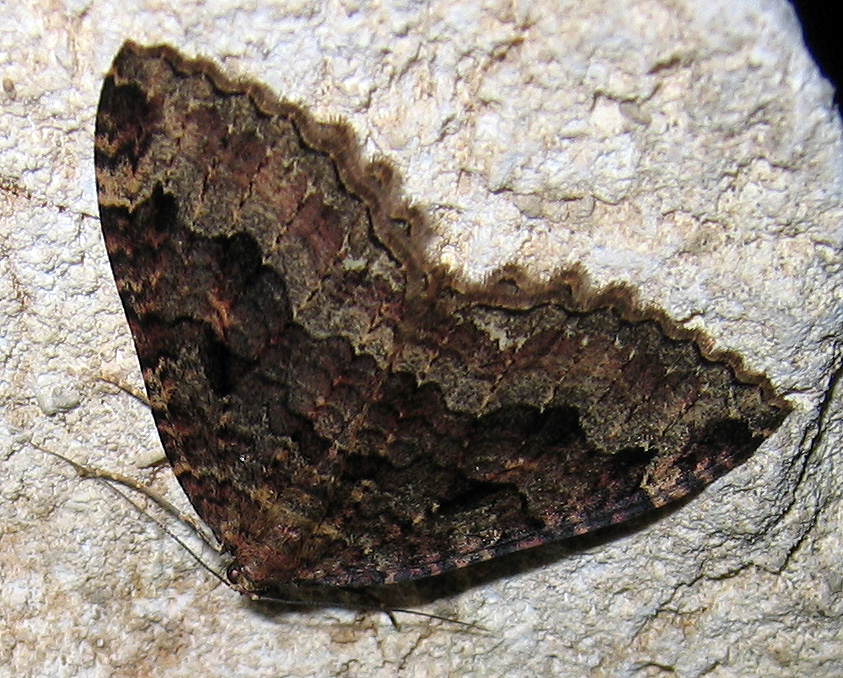

Scientific classification
- Kingdom: Animalia
- Phylum: Arthropoda
- Class: Insecta
- Order: Lepidoptera
- Family: Geometridae
- Genus: Triphosa
- Species: T. dubitata

Binomial name
- Triphosa dubitata (Linnaeus, 1758)

Synonyms
- Phalaena dubitata Linnaeus, 1758

= Triphosa dubitata =

Species of moth

Triphosa dubitata, the tissue, is a moth of the family Geometridae. The species was first described by Carl Linnaeus in his 1758 10th edition of Systema Naturae. It is found from north-west Africa across the Palearctic to Japan.

The wingspan is 38–48 mm. Adults are on wing from August to September depending on the location.

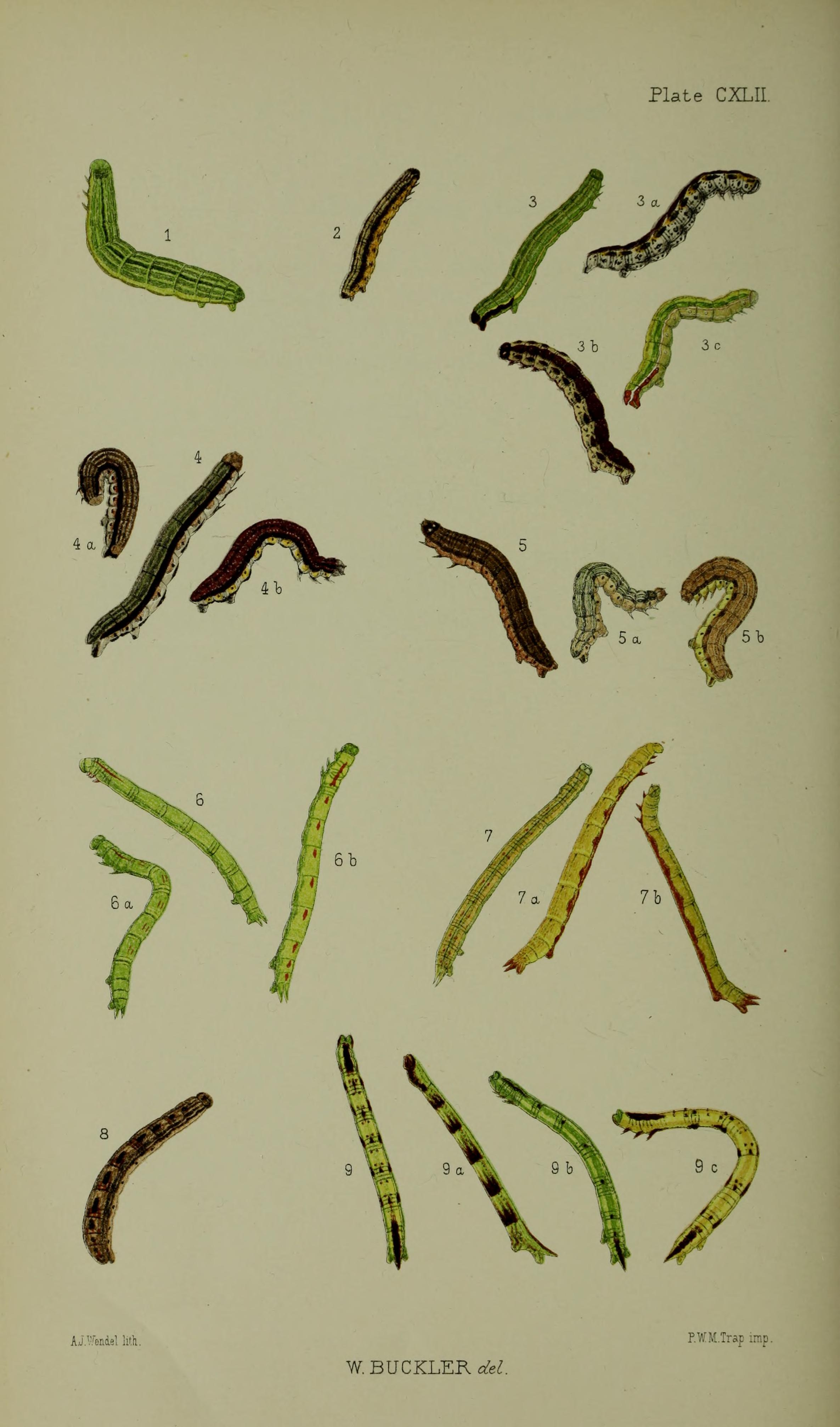
Fig 1 larvae after final moult

The larvae feed on bird cherry (Prunus padus), Rhamnus species (including alder buckthorn (Rhamnus frangula), buckthorn (Rhamnus cathartica) and ash (Fraxinus excelsior).

== Subspecies ==
- Triphosa dubitata dubitata
- Triphosa dubitata amblychiles Prout, 1937
