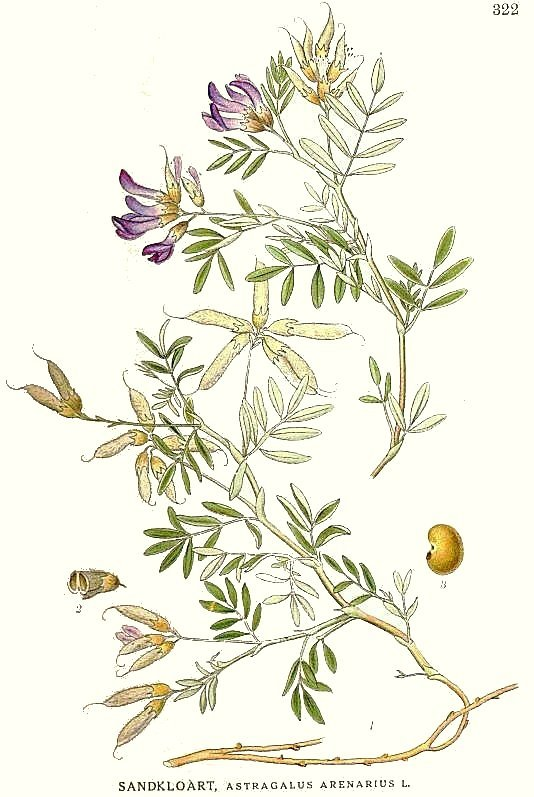
- Botanical illustration of Astragalus arenarius

Conservation status
- Least Concern (IUCN 3.1)

Scientific classification
- Kingdom: Plantae
- Clade: Tracheophytes
- Clade: Angiosperms
- Clade: Eudicots
- Clade: Rosids
- Order: Fabales
- Family: Fabaceae
- Subfamily: Faboideae
- Genus: Astragalus
- Species: A. arenarius

Binomial name
- Astragalus arenarius L.

Synonyms
- Kirchnera arenaria (L.) Opiz; Philammos arenarius (L.) Stev.; Tragacantha arenaria (L.) Kuntze

= Astragalus arenarius =

Species of legume

Astragalus arenarius, the sand milk-vetch or sand milkvetch, is a species of milkvetch mostly found in Central and Eastern Europe, with populations in Russia stretching perhaps as far as the Urals, and a few instances in Sweden, Finland, and perhaps Denmark. The center of diversity appears to be in Central Russia. Its chromosome number is 2n = 16.

== Description ==
The somewhat recumbent A. arenarius has slender branched stems from 10 to 40 cm long, and typically reaches 30 cm tall. It can be distinguished from its congeners by its having leaflets grouped in 2 to 6 pairs, 2 to 4 mm wide by 10 to 20 mm long; calyces that are characterized by having mostly strongly asymmetric bifurcate hairs; a standard (the large posterior petal seen in legume flowers) 15 to 17 mm long; and legumes that 12 to 20 mm long. Its petals range in color from light purple to lilac, and rarely can be white. The flowering time is from June to July.

== Ecology ==
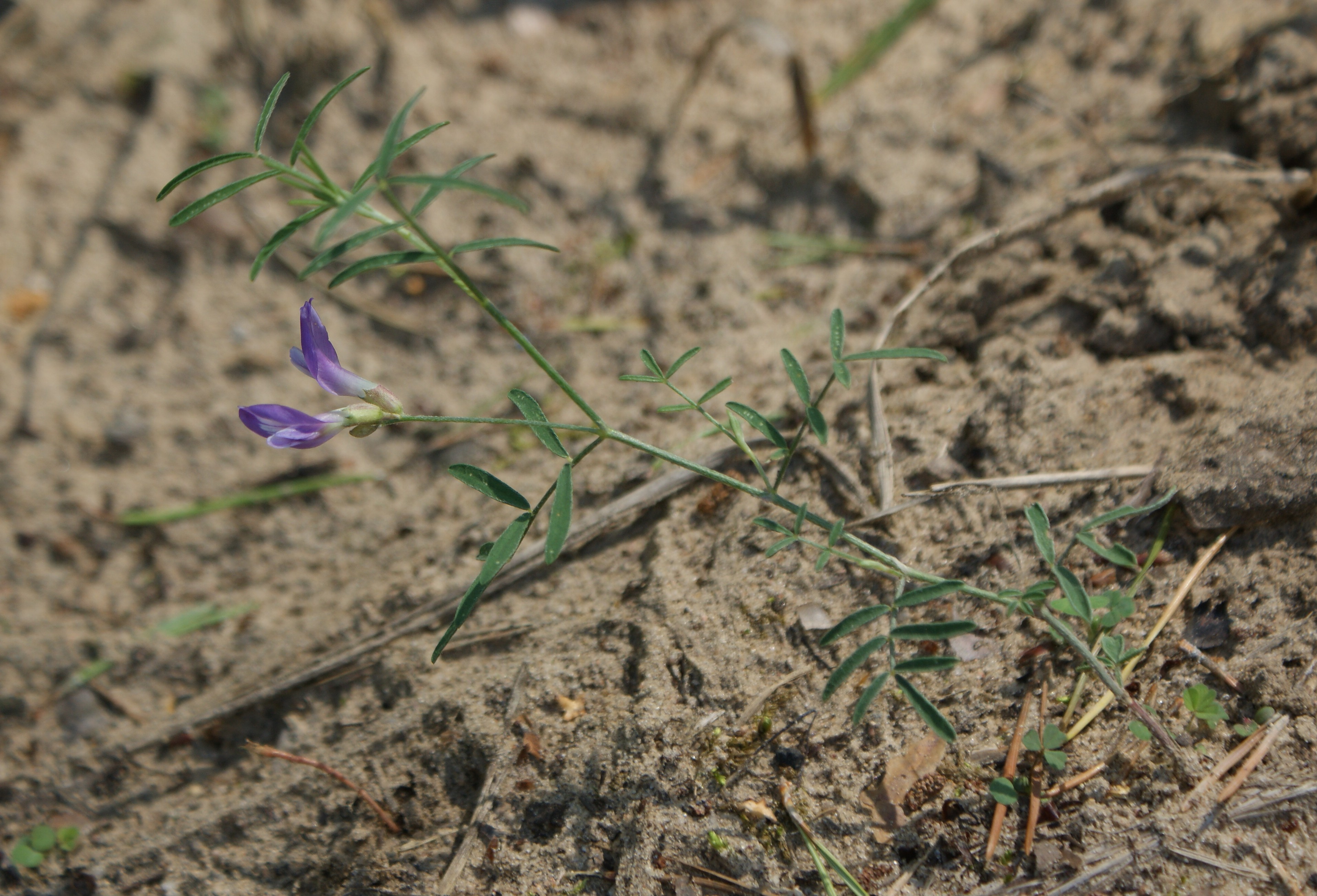
In a typical sandy habitat

As the specific name implies it grows in sandy or gravelly areas, in places that have limited competition from grasses, such as sandy open pine woodlands, dunes, river banks, roadsides and railway embankments. The larvae of the moth species Coleophora gallipennella, C. onobrychiella, C. polonicella and Syncopacma albifrontella feed on A. arenarius.
