= Coleophora onobrychiella =

Scientific classification
- Kingdom: Animalia
- Phylum: Arthropoda
- Clade: Pancrustacea
- Class: Insecta
- Order: Lepidoptera
- Family: Coleophoridae
- Genus: Coleophora
- Species: C. onobrychiella

Binomial name
- Coleophora onobrychiella Zeller, 1849

Synonyms
- Coleophora arenariella Zeller, 1865

Species of moth

Coleophora onobrychiella is a moth of the family Coleophoridae. It is found from Sweden to the Pyrenees, Italy and Greece and from France to Romania. It is also found in China.

The wingspan is 14–15 mm.

The larvae feed on Astragalus arenarius, Astragalus hamosus, Astragalus onobrychis, Genista tincoria, Hippocrepis comosa, Onobrychis sativa, Onobrychis saxatilis, Onobrychis supina and Onobrychis viciifolia. Larvae can be found from autumn to the following June.
