= Syncopacma consimilis =

Scientific classification
- Domain: Eukaryota
- Kingdom: Animalia
- Phylum: Arthropoda
- Class: Insecta
- Order: Lepidoptera
- Family: Gelechiidae
- Genus: Syncopacma
- Species: S. consimilis

Binomial name
- Syncopacma consimilis Janse, 1951

Species of moth

Syncopacma consimilis is a moth of the family Gelechiidae. It was described by Anthonie Johannes Theodorus Janse in 1951. It is found in South Africa.
