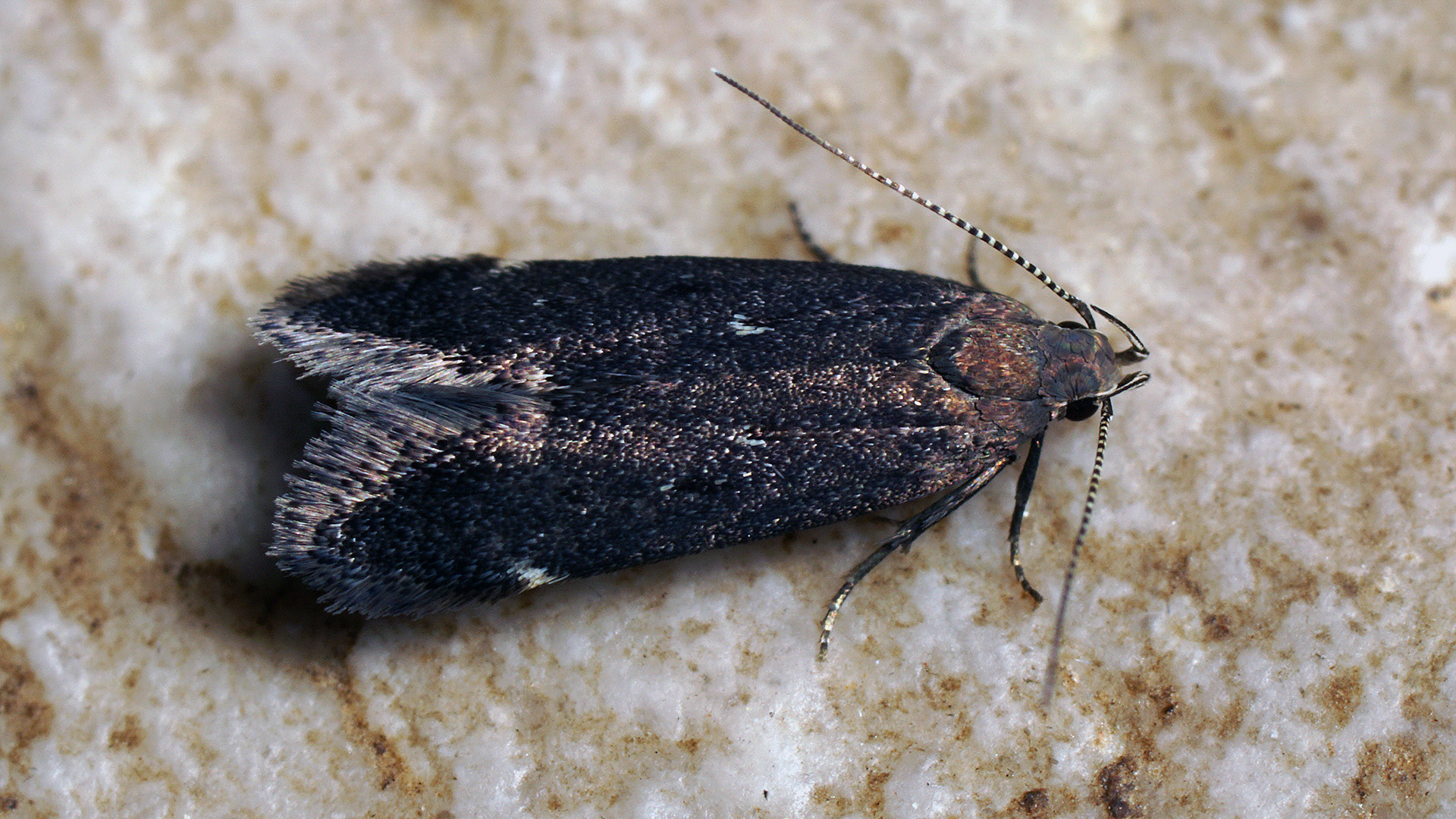

Scientific classification
- Domain: Eukaryota
- Kingdom: Animalia
- Phylum: Arthropoda
- Class: Insecta
- Order: Lepidoptera
- Family: Gelechiidae
- Genus: Syncopacma
- Species: S. vinella

Binomial name
- Syncopacma vinella (Bankes, 1898)

Synonyms
- Aproaerema vinella Bankes, 1898; Aproaerema vinella f. fasciata Bankes, 1898; Anacampsis biformella Schütze, 1902

= Syncopacma vinella =

Species of moth

Syncopacma vinella, the Brighton sober, is a moth of the family Gelechiidae. It was described by Bankes in 1898. It is found in Europe, where it has been recorded from Denmark to Hungary, and from Great Britain to Slovakia.

The wingspan is 10.5–12 mm. The forewings are rather glossy fuscous-black, tinged with violet and minutely speckled with pale scales. The hindwings are satiny-grey.

The larvae feed on Genista tinctoria, Medicago falcata, Medicago sativa and Trifolium pratense. They mine the leaves of their host plant.
