= Syncopacma telaviviella =

Scientific classification
- Kingdom: Animalia
- Phylum: Arthropoda
- Clade: Pancrustacea
- Class: Insecta
- Order: Lepidoptera
- Family: Gelechiidae
- Genus: Syncopacma
- Species: S. telaviviella

Binomial name
- Syncopacma telaviviella (Amsel, 1933)

Synonyms
- Anacampsis telaviviella Amsel, 1933

Species of moth

Syncopacma telaviviella is a moth of the family Gelechiidae. It was described by Hans Georg Amsel in 1933 and is found in Palestine.
