= Syncopacma adversa =

Scientific classification
- Domain: Eukaryota
- Kingdom: Animalia
- Phylum: Arthropoda
- Class: Insecta
- Order: Lepidoptera
- Family: Gelechiidae
- Genus: Syncopacma
- Species: S. adversa

Binomial name
- Syncopacma adversa (Braun, 1930)

Synonyms
- Stomopteryx adversa Braun, 1930; Aproaerema adversa (Braun, 1930)

Species of moth

Syncopacma adversa is a moth of the family Gelechiidae. It was described by Annette Frances Braun in 1930. It is found in North America, where it has been recorded from California, Illinois, Kentucky, Ohio and West Virginia.

The wingspan is about 11 mm.

The species has been reared from larva living between leaflets of Psoralea onobrychis.
