= Syncopacma perfuscata =

Scientific classification
- Kingdom: Animalia
- Phylum: Arthropoda
- Clade: Pancrustacea
- Class: Insecta
- Order: Lepidoptera
- Family: Gelechiidae
- Genus: Syncopacma
- Species: S. perfuscata

Binomial name
- Syncopacma perfuscata Janse, 1951

Species of moth

Syncopacma perfuscata is a moth of the family Gelechiidae. It was described by Anthonie Johannes Theodorus Janse in 1951. It is found in South Africa.
