= Syncopacma crotolariella =

Scientific classification
- Domain: Eukaryota
- Kingdom: Animalia
- Phylum: Arthropoda
- Class: Insecta
- Order: Lepidoptera
- Family: Gelechiidae
- Genus: Syncopacma
- Species: S. crotolariella

Binomial name
- Syncopacma crotolariella (Busck, 1900)

Synonyms
- Aproaerema crotolariella Busck, 1900; Syncopacma crotalariella

Species of moth

Syncopacma crotolariella is a moth of the family Gelechiidae. It was described by August Busck in 1900. It is found in North America, where it has been recorded from Florida.

The wingspan is 8.2-8.8 mm. The forewings are bluish black, with sparse lighter blue metallic scales intermixed, especially toward the apex. The hindwings are gray with purple reflections.

The larvae feed on Crotalaria pumilla. Young larvae mine the leaves of their host plant. Later instars tie the leaves together. The larvae have a yellowish white body and head and reach a length of about 6 mm when full-grown. Pupation takes place in a slight web among the leaves.
