= Syncopacma azosterella =

Scientific classification
- Domain: Eukaryota
- Kingdom: Animalia
- Phylum: Arthropoda
- Class: Insecta
- Order: Lepidoptera
- Family: Gelechiidae
- Genus: Syncopacma
- Species: S. azosterella

Binomial name
- Syncopacma azosterella (Herrich-Schäffer, 1854)

Synonyms
- Anacampsis azosterella Herrich-Schäffer, 1854; Anacampsis ignobiliella Heinemann, 1870

Species of moth

Syncopacma azosterella is a moth of the family Gelechiidae. It was described by Gottlieb August Wilhelm Herrich-Schäffer in 1854. It is found in Morocco, Portugal, Spain, France, Austria, the Czech Republic, Slovenia, Hungary, Bulgaria, Romania, Greece, Russia (southern Ural) and Ukraine.
