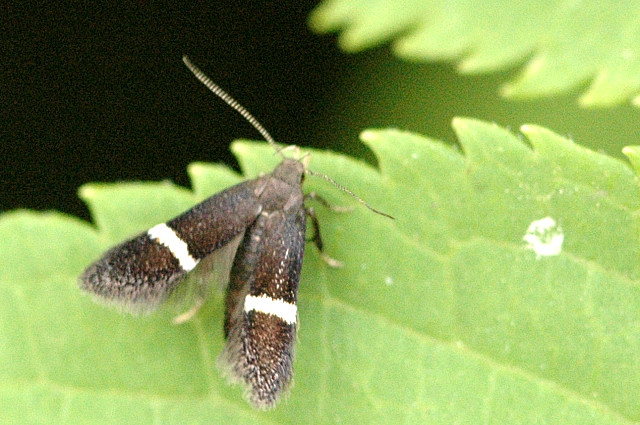

Scientific classification
- Kingdom: Animalia
- Phylum: Arthropoda
- Clade: Pancrustacea
- Class: Insecta
- Order: Lepidoptera
- Family: Gelechiidae
- Genus: Syncopacma
- Species: S. larseniella

Binomial name
- Syncopacma larseniella Gozmány, 1957

= Syncopacma larseniella =

Species of moth

Syncopacma larseniella is a moth of the family Gelechiidae. It is found in most of Europe.

The wingspan is about 12 mm. Adults are on wing in June and July.

The larvae feed on Lotus corniculatus.
