= Syncopacma zonariella =

Scientific classification
- Kingdom: Animalia
- Phylum: Arthropoda
- Class: Insecta
- Order: Lepidoptera
- Family: Gelechiidae
- Genus: Syncopacma
- Species: S. zonariella

Binomial name
- Syncopacma zonariella (Walsingham, 1905)

Synonyms
- Aproaerema zonariella Walsingham, 1905

Species of moth

Syncopacma zonariella is a moth of the family Gelechiidae. It was described by Thomas de Grey, 6th Baron Walsingham, in 1905. It is found in Algeria.

The wingspan is about 16 mm. The forewings are black, sparsely sprinkled with pale ochreous scales, which are slightly grouped in the fold a little beyond its middle and on the disc above and beyond. At the outer third of the wing-length is a straight, clearly defined, pale ochreous fascia, its outer edge somewhat jagged. The hindwings are grey, with a brownish tinge.
