= Syncopacma cincticulella =

Scientific classification
- Domain: Eukaryota
- Kingdom: Animalia
- Phylum: Arthropoda
- Class: Insecta
- Order: Lepidoptera
- Family: Gelechiidae
- Genus: Syncopacma
- Species: S. cincticulella

Binomial name
- Syncopacma cincticulella (Bruand, 1851)

Synonyms
- Oecophora cincticulella Bruand, 1850; Anacampsis cincticulella Herrich-Schäffer, 1853

Species of moth

Syncopacma cincticulella is a moth of the family Gelechiidae. It was described by Charles Théophile Bruand d'Uzelle in 1851. It is found in Asia Minor and southern and south-eastern Europe, where it has been recorded from Spain, France, Germany, Austria, Switzerland, Italy, the Czech Republic, Slovakia, Hungary, Romania, Poland, Ukraine and Russia.

The wingspan is 9–12 mm.

The larvae feed on Astragalus glycyphyllos, Coronilla varia, Cytisus scoparius, Dorycnium species, Genista germanica, Genista tinctoria and Ornithopus species.
