= Syncopacma patruella =

Scientific classification
- Kingdom: Animalia
- Phylum: Arthropoda
- Class: Insecta
- Order: Lepidoptera
- Family: Gelechiidae
- Genus: Syncopacma
- Species: S. patruella

Binomial name
- Syncopacma patruella (Mann, 1857)

Synonyms
- Gelechia patruella Mann, 1857; Anacampsis fulvistilella Rebel, 1891

Species of moth

Syncopacma patruella is a moth of the family Gelechiidae. It was described by Josef Johann Mann in 1857. It is found in Asia Minor and Europe, where it has been recorded from Portugal, Spain, France, Germany, Switzerland, Austria, Italy, Slovakia, Croatia, Romania, Bulgaria, Hungary, former Yugoslavia, North Macedonia, Greece and Ukraine, as well as on Corsica and Sicily.

The wingspan is 13–14 mm.
