= Syncopacma sikoraella =

Scientific classification
- Kingdom: Animalia
- Phylum: Arthropoda
- Class: Insecta
- Order: Lepidoptera
- Family: Gelechiidae
- Genus: Syncopacma
- Species: S. sikoraella

Binomial name
- Syncopacma sikoraella Viette, 1956

Species of moth

Syncopacma sikoraella is a moth of the family Gelechiidae. It was described by Pierre Viette in 1956. It is found in Madagascar.
