= Syncopacma dolini =

Scientific classification
- Domain: Eukaryota
- Kingdom: Animalia
- Phylum: Arthropoda
- Class: Insecta
- Order: Lepidoptera
- Family: Gelechiidae
- Genus: Syncopacma
- Species: S. dolini

Binomial name
- Syncopacma dolini Bidzilya, 2005

Species of moth

Syncopacma dolini is a moth of the family Gelechiidae. It was described by Oleksiy V. Bidzilya in 2005. It is found in Kyrgyzstan.
