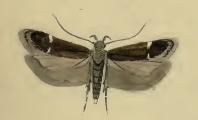

Scientific classification
- Domain: Eukaryota
- Kingdom: Animalia
- Phylum: Arthropoda
- Class: Insecta
- Order: Lepidoptera
- Family: Gelechiidae
- Genus: Syncopacma
- Species: S. albipalpella

Binomial name
- Syncopacma albipalpella (Herrich-Schäffer, 1854)

Synonyms
- Anacampsis albipalpella Herrich-Schaffer, 1854; Stomopteryx leucopalpella Herrich-Schäffer, 1854

= Syncopacma albipalpella =

Species of moth

Syncopacma albipalpella is a moth of the family Gelechiidae. It is found from Germany to Spain and Italy and from Great Britain to Austria.

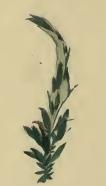
A sprig of Genista anglica with leaves spun together and discoloured by larva

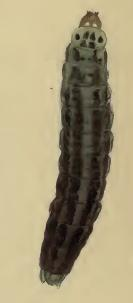
Larva

The wingspan is 9–11 mm. Adults are on wing in July.

The larvae feed on Lotus corniculatus, Lotus uliginosus, Medicago and Trifolium species.
