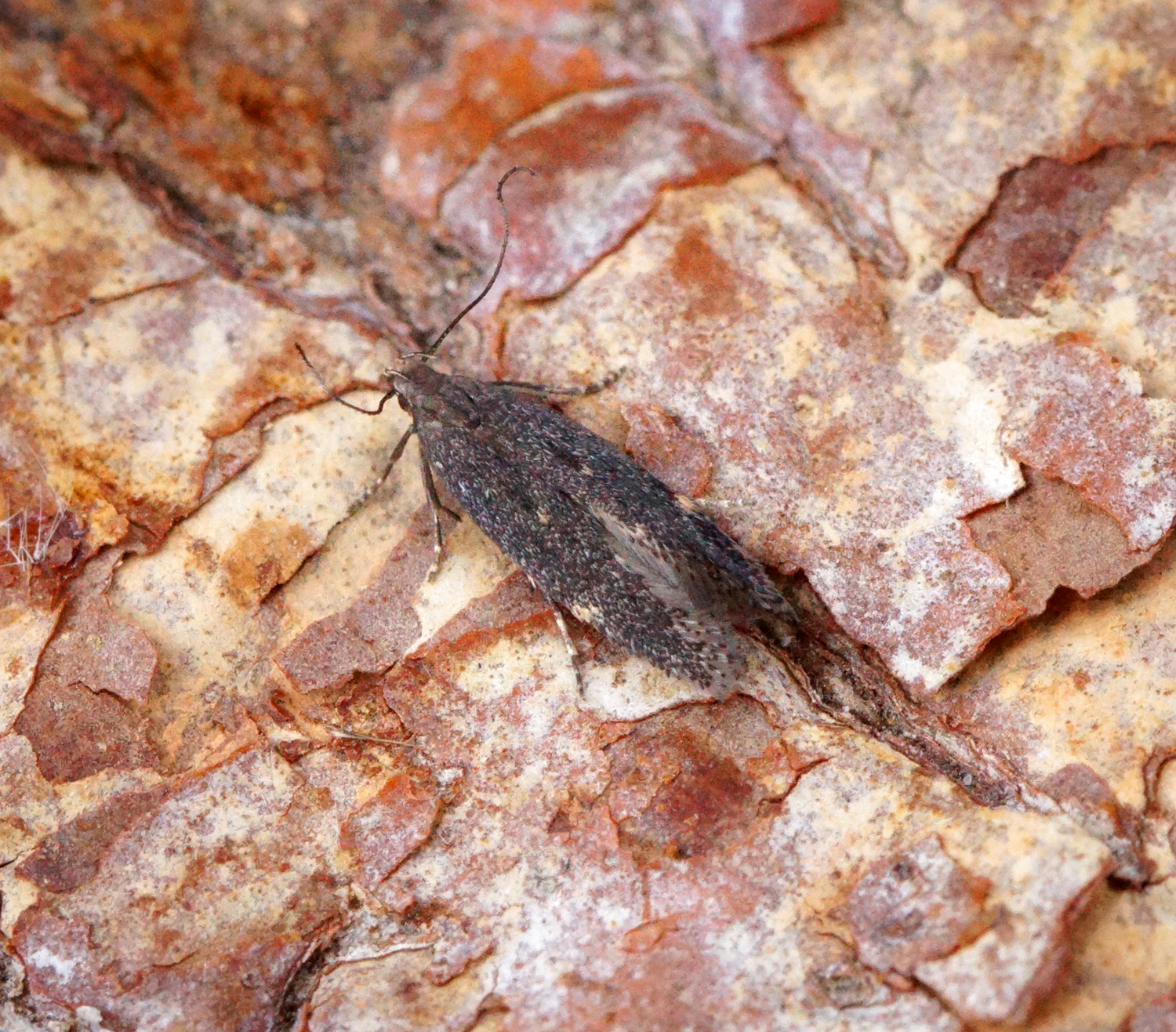
- Syncopacma sangiella Midi-Pyrénées

Scientific classification
- Kingdom: Animalia
- Phylum: Arthropoda
- Clade: Pancrustacea
- Class: Insecta
- Order: Lepidoptera
- Family: Gelechiidae
- Genus: Syncopacma
- Species: S. sangiella

Binomial name
- Syncopacma sangiella (Stainton, 1863)

Synonyms
- Gelechia sangiella Stainton, 1863

= Syncopacma sangiella =

Species of moth

Syncopacma sangiella, the brown sober, is a moth of the family Gelechiidae. It was described by Henry Tibbats Stainton in 1863. It is found in most of Europe, except the Benelux, Denmark and parts of the Balkan Peninsula.

The wingspan is 12–13 mm. The forewings are dark slaty fuscous, slightly purple-tinged; stigmata indistinctly darker, each sometimes followed by two or three ochreous-whitish scales, first discal much beyond plical; a small ochreous-whitish triangular spot, slightly outwardly oblique, on tornus, and another on costa opposite : vein 6 separate. Hindwings are grey. The larva is reddish -brown, anterior incisions whitish-green, dorsal line whitish on 2-4; head yellow-brown; plate of 2 black

The larvae feed on Lotus corniculatus, living between leaves spun together with silk.
