= Syncopacma incognitana =

Scientific classification
- Kingdom: Animalia
- Phylum: Arthropoda
- Clade: Pancrustacea
- Class: Insecta
- Order: Lepidoptera
- Family: Gelechiidae
- Genus: Syncopacma
- Species: S. incognitana

Binomial name
- Syncopacma incognitana Gozmány, 1957

Species of moth

Syncopacma incognitana is a moth of the family Gelechiidae. It was described by László Anthony Gozmány in 1957. It is found in Germany, Austria, Romania, Ukraine and Russia.

The wingspan is about 12 mm.
