= Syncopacma polychromella =

Scientific classification
- Domain: Eukaryota
- Kingdom: Animalia
- Phylum: Arthropoda
- Class: Insecta
- Order: Lepidoptera
- Family: Gelechiidae
- Genus: Syncopacma
- Species: S. polychromella

Binomial name
- Syncopacma polychromella (Rebel, 1902)

Synonyms
- List: Anacampsis polychromella Rebel, 1902; Syncopacma faceta Meyrick, 1914; Anacampsis argyrolobiella Caradja, 1920; Anacampsis polychromella var. rebeliella Caradja, 1920; Aproaerema polychromella (Rebel, 1902)

Species of moth

Syncopacma polychromella is a moth of the family Gelechiidae, it was described by Hans Rebel in 1902.

== Description ==
The wingspan is 7–10 mm. The head is white. The thorax brown mixed with white. The forewings are pale brown with a post median jagged white band and a dark apical 1/3.

== Range ==
It is found on the Iberian Peninsula and in the Czech Republic, Austria, Italy, Croatia, North Macedonia, Greece and Russia, as well as on the Canary Islands, Sicily, Malta and Crete. It is also present in Algeria, Egypt, Palestine, Jordan, Syria, Kuwait, Yemen, Central Asia (including Uzbekistan), Sudan, Namibia and South Africa. It has been recorded in Denmark, France, Great Britain and Ireland. In Britain the moth was first recorded, in February 1952, at Bexley, Kent and the second at Hook, Surrey in February 1992; most likely as accidental introductions. It has since been recorded as a migrant to England.

=== Immigration ===
In December 2015, during an extended period of airflow from as far south as the Azores, at least seventeen have been reported in southern England over three days (16 – 19 December).

== Host plant ==
The larvae feed on Astragalus unifoliolatus.
