= Syncopacma biareatella =

Scientific classification
- Kingdom: Animalia
- Phylum: Arthropoda
- Class: Insecta
- Order: Lepidoptera
- Family: Gelechiidae
- Genus: Syncopacma
- Species: S. biareatella

Binomial name
- Syncopacma biareatella (Erschoff, 1874)

Synonyms
- Cladodes biareatella Erschoff, 1874

Species of moth

Syncopacma biareatella is a moth of the family Gelechiidae. It was described by Nikolay Grigoryevich Erschoff in 1874. It is found in Kyzylkum Desert in Central Asia.
