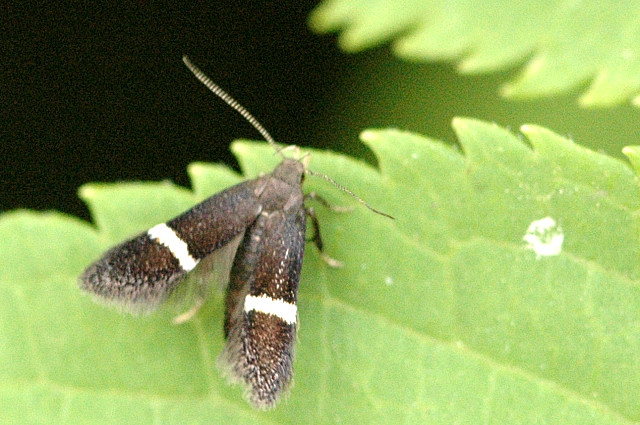
- Syncopacma larseniella

Scientific classification
- Domain: Eukaryota
- Kingdom: Animalia
- Phylum: Arthropoda
- Class: Insecta
- Order: Lepidoptera
- Family: Gelechiidae
- Subfamily: Anacampsinae
- Genus: Syncopacma; Meyrick, 1925

Synonyms
- Lixodessa Gozmány, 1957; Harpagus Stephens, 1834

= Syncopacma =

Genus of moths

Syncopacma is a genus of moths in the family Gelechiidae.

== Species ==
- Syncopacma acanthyllidis (Walsingham, 1905)
- Syncopacma adenocarpella (Rebel, 1927)
- Syncopacma adversa (Braun, 1930)
- Syncopacma albifrontella (Heinemann, 1870)
- Syncopacma albipalpella (Herrich-Schäffer, 1854)
- Syncopacma altaica Bidzilya, 2005
- Syncopacma azosterella (Herrich-Schäffer, 1854)
- Syncopacma biareatella (Erschoff, 1874)
- Syncopacma buvati Nel, 1995
- Syncopacma captivella (Herrich-Schäffer, 1854)
- Syncopacma centralis Piskunov, 1979
- Syncopacma cinctella (Clerck, 1759)
- Syncopacma cincticulella (Bruand, 1851)
- Syncopacma consimilis Janse, 1951
- Syncopacma coronillella (Treitschke, 1833)
- Syncopacma crotolariella (Busck, 1900)
- Syncopacma dolini Bidzilya, 2005
- Syncopacma euprosopa (Meyrick, 1926)
- Syncopacma genistae (Walsingham, 1908)
- Syncopacma incognitana Gozmány, 1957
- Syncopacma karvoneni (Hackman, 1950)
- Syncopacma larseniella Gozmány, 1957
- Syncopacma leportensis Guillermet, 2013
- Syncopacma linella (Chrétien, 1904)
- Syncopacma lutea Janse, 1960
- Syncopacma melanocephala Lvovsky & Piskunov, 1989
- Syncopacma metadesma (Meyrick, 1927)
- Syncopacma mitrella (Walsingham, 1905)
- Syncopacma monochromella Janse, 1951
- Syncopacma montanata Gozmány, 1957
- Syncopacma nigrella (Chambers, 1875)
- Syncopacma ochrofasciella (Toll, 1936)
- Syncopacma oxyspila (Meyrick, 1909)
- Syncopacma palpilineella (Chambers, 1875)
- Syncopacma patruella (Mann, 1857)
- Syncopacma perfuscata Janse, 1951
- Syncopacma polychromella (Rebel, 1902)
- Syncopacma sangiella (Stainton, 1863)
- Syncopacma semicostella (Staudinger, 1871)
- Syncopacma sikoraella Viette, 1956
- Syncopacma steppicolella Junnilainen, 2010
- Syncopacma suecicella (Wolff, 1958)
- Syncopacma syncrita (Meyrick, 1926)
- Syncopacma taeniolella (Zeller, 1839)
- Syncopacma tadzhika Bidzilya, 2005
- Syncopacma telaviviella (Amsel, 1933)
- Syncopacma thaumalea (Walsingham, 1905)
- Syncopacma ussuriella (Caradja, 1920)
- Syncopacma vinella (Bankes, 1898)
- Syncopacma wormiella (Wolff, 1958)
- Syncopacma zonariella (Walsingham, 1905)

== Status unclear ==
- Syncopacma schillei (Strand, 1919), described as Anacampsis schillei from Galicia
- Syncopacma serratella (Amsel, 1952), described as Schuetzeia serratella from Sardinia
