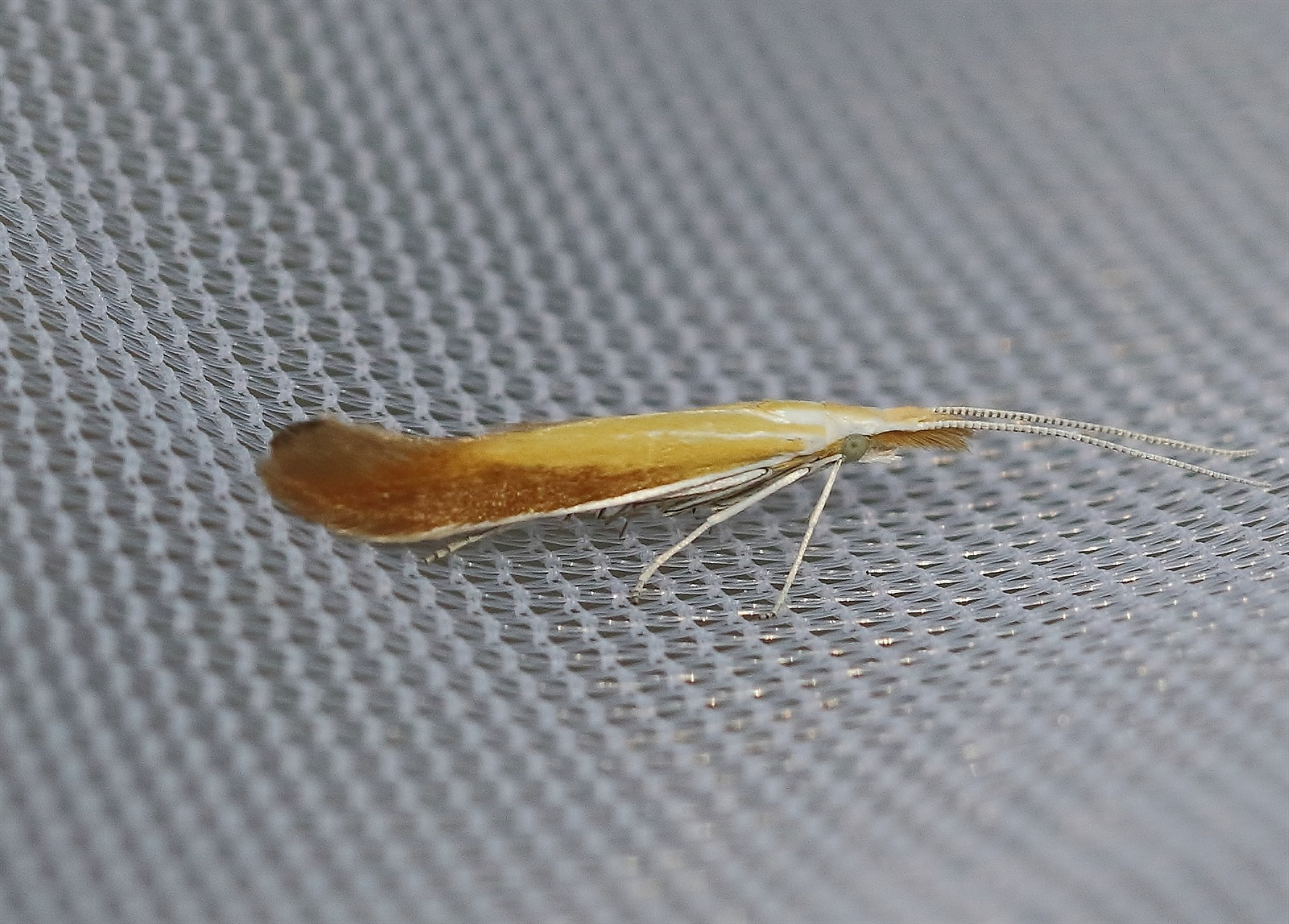

Scientific classification
- Kingdom: Animalia
- Phylum: Arthropoda
- Clade: Pancrustacea
- Class: Insecta
- Order: Lepidoptera
- Family: Coleophoridae
- Genus: Coleophora
- Species: C. gallipennella

Binomial name
- Coleophora gallipennella (Hubner, 1796)

Synonyms
- Tinea gallipennella Hubner, 1796

= Coleophora gallipennella =

Species of moth

Coleophora gallipennella is a moth of the family Coleophoridae. It is found in most of Europe (except the Iberian Peninsula, most of the Balkan Peninsula, Ireland, Great Britain and the Netherlands). It is also found in Asia Minor.

The wingspan is 19–21 mm (0.75–0.83 in). Adults are on wing in June and July.

The larvae feed on Astragalus arenarius and Astragalus glycyphyllos. They feed on the generative organs of their host plant.
