= Syncopacma centralis =

Scientific classification
- Kingdom: Animalia
- Phylum: Arthropoda
- Clade: Pancrustacea
- Class: Insecta
- Order: Lepidoptera
- Family: Gelechiidae
- Genus: Syncopacma
- Species: S. centralis

Binomial name
- Syncopacma centralis Piskunov, 1979

Species of moth

Syncopacma centralis is a moth of the family Gelechiidae. It was described by Piskunov in 1979. It is found in Mongolia.
