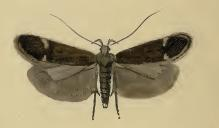

Scientific classification
- Domain: Eukaryota
- Kingdom: Animalia
- Phylum: Arthropoda
- Class: Insecta
- Order: Lepidoptera
- Family: Gelechiidae
- Genus: Syncopacma
- Species: S. coronillella

Binomial name
- Syncopacma coronillella (Treitschke, 1833)

Synonyms
- Lita coronillella Treitschke, 1833; Syncopacma fournieri Nel, 1998

= Syncopacma coronillella =

Species of moth

Syncopacma coronillella is a moth of the family Gelechiidae. It is found in most of Europe, except Ireland, Great Britain, Fennoscandia, the Baltic region, the Benelux, Portugal and part of the Balkan Peninsula.

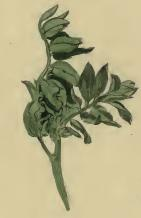
A sprig of Coronilla varia with leaves united by larva

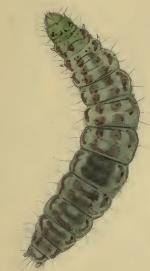
Larva

The wingspan is 10–12 mm.

The larvae feed on Securigera varia.
