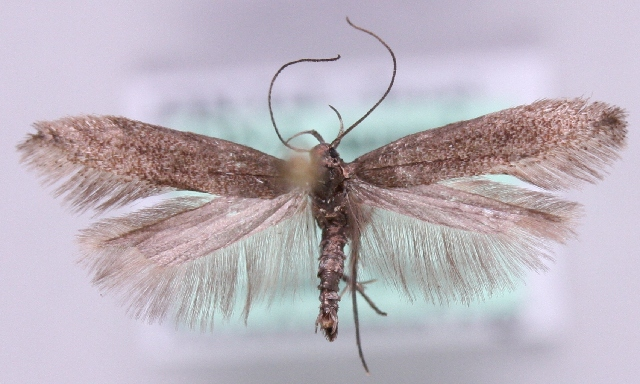

Scientific classification
- Domain: Eukaryota
- Kingdom: Animalia
- Phylum: Arthropoda
- Class: Insecta
- Order: Lepidoptera
- Family: Gelechiidae
- Genus: Syncopacma
- Species: S. karvoneni

Binomial name
- Syncopacma karvoneni (Hackman, 1950)

Synonyms
- Stomopteryx karvoneni Hackman, 1950; Aproaerema karvoneni

= Syncopacma karvoneni =

Species of moth

Syncopacma karvoneni is a moth of the family Gelechiidae. It was described by Hackman in 1950. It is found in Switzerland, Fennoscandia and northern Russia.

The wingspan is 11–13 mm.

The larvae feed on Vicia cracca, Trifolium pratense, Lathyrus pratensis, Lathyrus palustris and Melilotus alba. Young larvae mine the leaves of their host plant. The mine has the form of a small full-depth gallery.
