= Syncopacma buvati =

Scientific classification
- Domain: Eukaryota
- Kingdom: Animalia
- Phylum: Arthropoda
- Class: Insecta
- Order: Lepidoptera
- Family: Gelechiidae
- Genus: Syncopacma
- Species: S. buvati

Binomial name
- Syncopacma buvati Nel, 1995

Species of moth

Syncopacma buvati is a moth of the family Gelechiidae. It was described by Jacques Nel in 1995. It is found in France.
