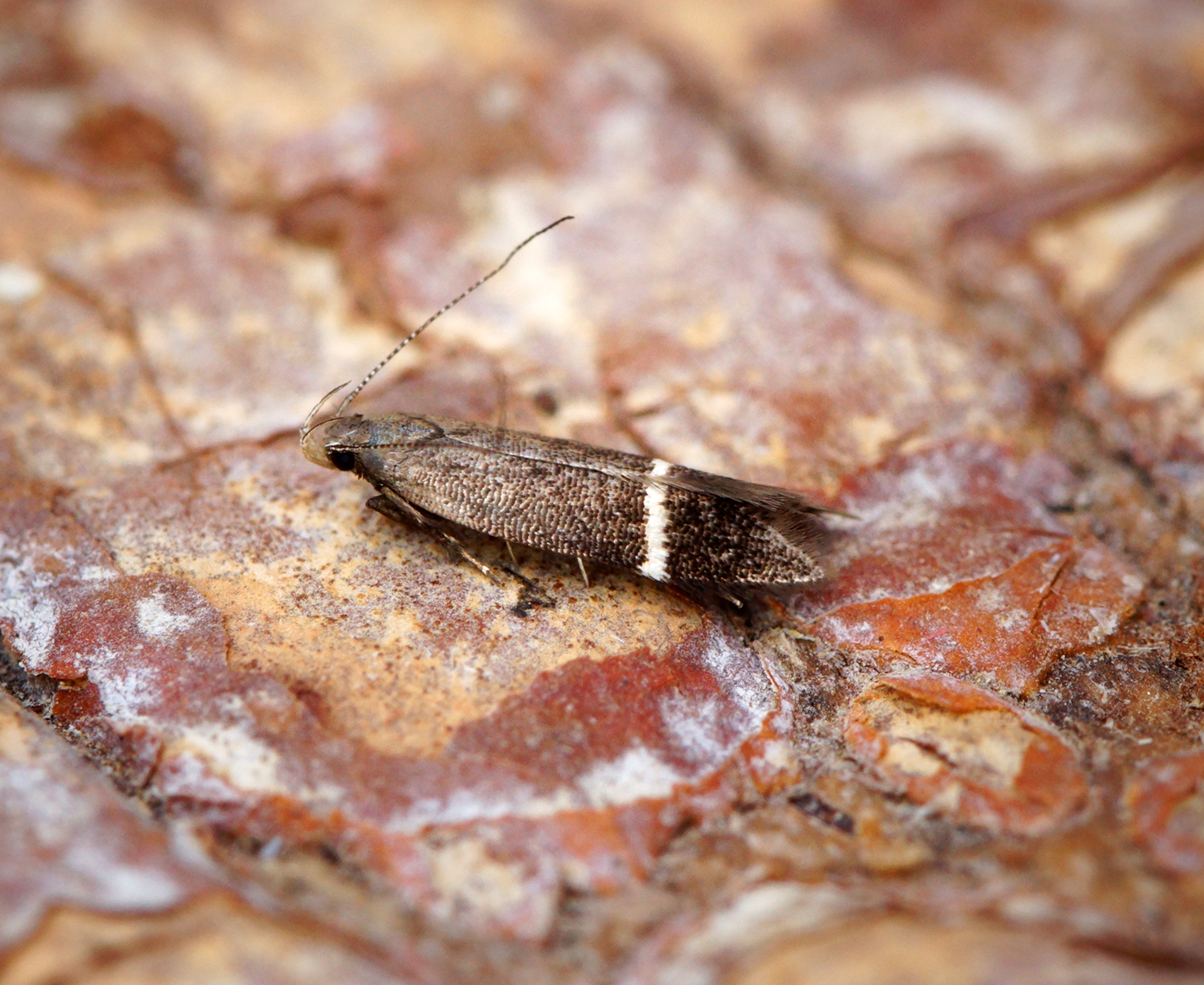

Scientific classification
- Domain: Eukaryota
- Kingdom: Animalia
- Phylum: Arthropoda
- Class: Insecta
- Order: Lepidoptera
- Family: Gelechiidae
- Genus: Syncopacma
- Species: S. ochrofasciella

Binomial name
- Syncopacma ochrofasciella (Toll, 1936)

Synonyms
- Aproaerema ochrofasciella Toll, 1936; Lixodessa ochrofasciella

= Syncopacma ochrofasciella =

Species of moth

Syncopacma ochrofasciella is a moth of the family Gelechiidae. It was described by Sergiusz Toll in 1936. It is found in the Russian Far East, China (Jilin) and Europe, where it has been recorded from Germany, Poland, Austria, the Czech Republic, Slovakia, Hungary, Romania, Latvia, Ukraine and Russia.

The wingspan is about 11.5 mm.
