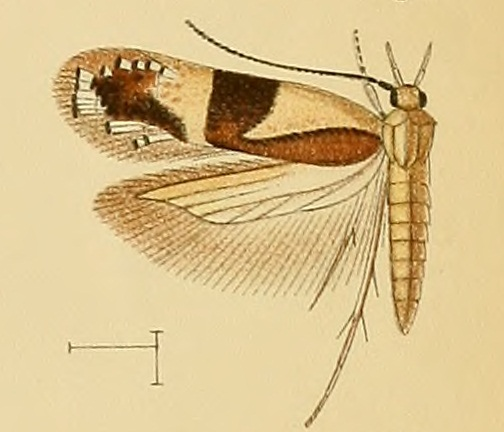

Scientific classification
- Domain: Eukaryota
- Kingdom: Animalia
- Phylum: Arthropoda
- Class: Insecta
- Order: Lepidoptera
- Family: Gelechiidae
- Genus: Syncopacma
- Species: S. thaumalea

Binomial name
- Syncopacma thaumalea (Walsingham, 1905)

Synonyms
- Aproaerema thaumalea Walsingham, 1905

= Syncopacma thaumalea =

Species of moth

Syncopacma thaumalea is a moth of the family Gelechiidae. It is found on the Canary Islands and in North Africa.

The wingspan is 8–9 mm. The forewings are shining copper-brown. The hindwings are whitish grey.
