= Syncopacma albifrontella =

Scientific classification
- Kingdom: Animalia
- Phylum: Arthropoda
- Clade: Pancrustacea
- Class: Insecta
- Order: Lepidoptera
- Family: Gelechiidae
- Genus: Syncopacma
- Species: S. albifrontella

Binomial name
- Syncopacma albifrontella (Heinemann, 1870)

Synonyms
- Anacampsis albifrontella Heinemann, 1870

Species of moth

Syncopacma albifrontella is a moth of the family Gelechiidae. It was described by Hermann von Heinemann in 1870. It is found in Great Britain, France, Germany, Austria, Switzerland, Italy, the Czech Republic, Slovakia, Hungary, Romania, Latvia, Lithuania, Ukraine and Russia.

The wingspan is about 10 mm.

The larvae have been recorded feeding on Astragalus arenarius, but probably also feed on other Astragalus species.
