= Syncopacma montanata =

Scientific classification
- Kingdom: Animalia
- Phylum: Arthropoda
- Clade: Pancrustacea
- Class: Insecta
- Order: Lepidoptera
- Family: Gelechiidae
- Genus: Syncopacma
- Species: S. montanata

Binomial name
- Syncopacma montanata Gozmány, 1957

Species of moth

Syncopacma montanata is a moth of the family Gelechiidae. It was described by László Anthony Gozmány in 1957. It is found in France, Italy, Romania and Ukraine.
