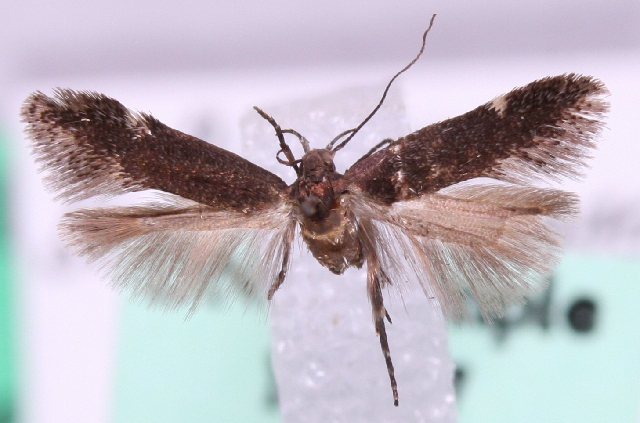

Scientific classification
- Domain: Eukaryota
- Kingdom: Animalia
- Phylum: Arthropoda
- Class: Insecta
- Order: Lepidoptera
- Family: Gelechiidae
- Genus: Syncopacma
- Species: S. suecicella

Binomial name
- Syncopacma suecicella (Wolff, 1958)

Synonyms
- Stomopteryx suecicella Wolff, 1958

= Syncopacma suecicella =

Species of moth

Syncopacma suecicella is a moth of the family Gelechiidae. It was described by Wolff in 1958. It is found in Great Britain, Portugal, Spain, France, Germany, Denmark, Sweden, Austria, Italy, the Czech Republic, Hungary, Greece and Russia, as well as on Sardinia.

The wingspan is 9–10 mm.
