= Syncopacma metadesma =

Scientific classification
- Kingdom: Animalia
- Phylum: Arthropoda
- Class: Insecta
- Order: Lepidoptera
- Family: Gelechiidae
- Genus: Syncopacma
- Species: S. metadesma

Binomial name
- Syncopacma metadesma (Meyrick, 1927)

Synonyms
- Stomopteryx metadesma Meyrick, 1927

Species of moth

Syncopacma metadesma is a moth of the family Gelechiidae. It was described by Edward Meyrick in 1927. It is found in North America, where it has been recorded from California.

The wingspan is about 11 mm. The forewings are blackish with a slightly oblique narrow irregular white fascia at two-thirds. The hindwings are gray.
