= Syncopacma nigrella =

Scientific classification
- Kingdom: Animalia
- Phylum: Arthropoda
- Clade: Pancrustacea
- Class: Insecta
- Order: Lepidoptera
- Family: Gelechiidae
- Genus: Syncopacma
- Species: S. nigrella

Binomial name
- Syncopacma nigrella (Chambers, 1875)

Synonyms
- Gelechia nigrella Chambers, 1875

Species of moth

Syncopacma nigrella is a moth of the family Gelechiidae. It was described by Vactor Tousey Chambers in 1875. It is found in North America, where it has been recorded from Wyoming, Washington, California, Texas, Utah and Oklahoma.

The length of the forewings is 4.3–6 mm.

The larvae feed on Lupinus species.
