= Syncopacma oxyspila =

Scientific classification
- Kingdom: Animalia
- Phylum: Arthropoda
- Class: Insecta
- Order: Lepidoptera
- Family: Gelechiidae
- Genus: Syncopacma
- Species: S. oxyspila

Binomial name
- Syncopacma oxyspila (Meyrick, 1909)

Synonyms
- Anacampsis oxyspila Meyrick, 1909; ?Stomopteryx nerteria Meyrick, 1906; Telphusa acrophylla Meyrick, 1911

Species of moth

Syncopacma oxyspila is a moth of the family Gelechiidae. It was described by Edward Meyrick in 1909. It is found in South Africa and Namibia.

The wingspan is 9–10 mm. The forewings are dark fuscous, with a faint purplish tinge and opposite triangular whitish costal and dorsal spots at two-thirds, almost meeting. The hindwings are rather dark grey.
