= Syncopacma altaica =

Scientific classification
- Domain: Eukaryota
- Kingdom: Animalia
- Phylum: Arthropoda
- Class: Insecta
- Order: Lepidoptera
- Family: Gelechiidae
- Genus: Syncopacma
- Species: S. altaica

Binomial name
- Syncopacma altaica Bidzilya, 2005

Species of moth

Syncopacma altaica is a moth of the family Gelechiidae. It was described by Oleksiy V. Bidzilya in 2005. It is found in the Altai Mountains of Central Asia.
