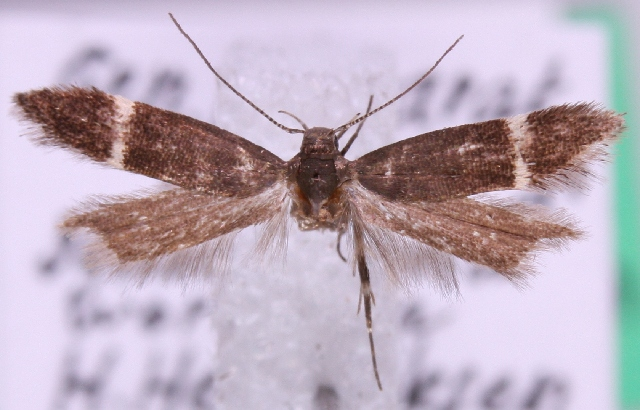

Scientific classification
- Kingdom: Animalia
- Phylum: Arthropoda
- Clade: Pancrustacea
- Class: Insecta
- Order: Lepidoptera
- Family: Gelechiidae
- Genus: Syncopacma
- Species: S. wormiella

Binomial name
- Syncopacma wormiella (Wolff, 1958)

Synonyms
- Stomopteryx wormiella Wolff, 1958

= Syncopacma wormiella =

Species of moth

Syncopacma wormiella is a moth of the family Gelechiidae. It was described by Wolff in 1958. It is found in Germany, Denmark, Austria, Switzerland, Italy, the Czech Republic, Slovakia, Hungary, Romania, Sweden, Finland, Estonia, Latvia, Ukraine, European Russia, as well as the Russian Far East.

The wingspan is about 12 mm.

The larvae feed on Ononis spinosa.
