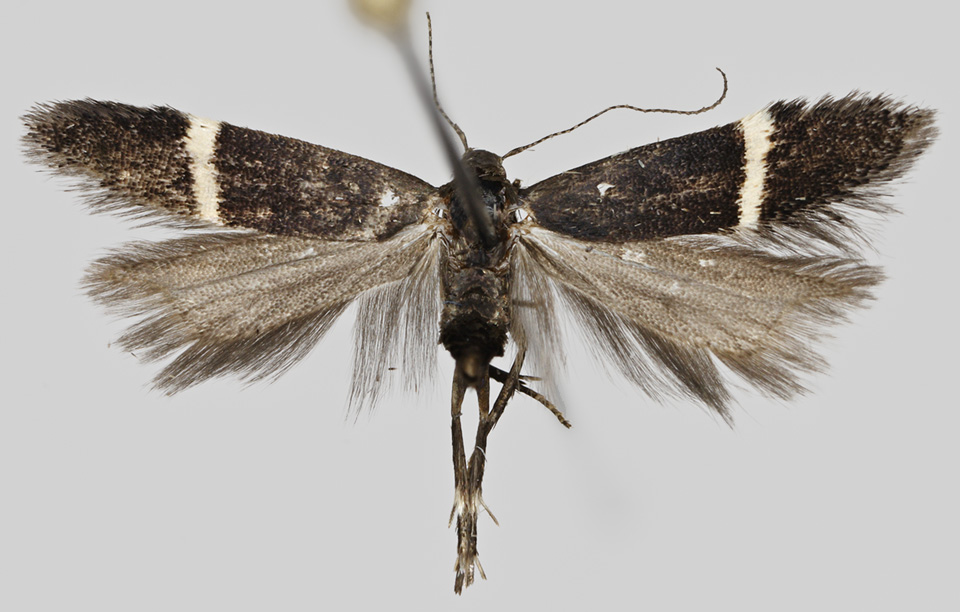

Scientific classification
- Kingdom: Animalia
- Phylum: Arthropoda
- Clade: Pancrustacea
- Class: Insecta
- Order: Lepidoptera
- Family: Gelechiidae
- Genus: Syncopacma
- Species: S. cinctella

Binomial name
- Syncopacma cinctella (Clerck, 1759)

Synonyms
- Phalaena vorticella Scopoli, 1763; Syncopacma vorticella (Scopoli, 1763); Phalaena cinctella Clerck, 1759; Phalaena ligulella Denis & Schiffermüller, 1775; Gelechia ruptella Constant, 1865; Anacampsis obliquella Ragonot, 1875; Anacampsis perforatella Reutti, 1898; Anacampsis vorticella ab. destrigella Klemensiewicz, 1902; Syncopacma finlandica Gozmány, 1957

= Syncopacma cinctella =

Species of moth

Syncopacma cinctella is a moth of the family Gelechiidae. It is found in all of Europe, Asia Minor and North Africa. In the east, the range extends through Siberia to the Russian Far East.

The wingspan is 10–14 mm. The forewings are bronzy-black; a nearly straight narrow white fascia beyond middle. Hindwings are fuscous, darker posteriorly. Under-surface with white fascia appearing only as a costal spot on forewings. The larva is pale green, suffused with reddish head pale yellow-brown; 2 with four black semilunules filled with yellow-brown.

Adults are on wing from June to August.

The larvae feed on Lotus corniculatus. The larvae live between leaves spun together with silk.
