= Syncopacma captivella =

Scientific classification
- Domain: Eukaryota
- Kingdom: Animalia
- Phylum: Arthropoda
- Class: Insecta
- Order: Lepidoptera
- Family: Gelechiidae
- Genus: Syncopacma
- Species: S. captivella

Binomial name
- Syncopacma captivella (Herrich-Schäffer, 1854)

Synonyms
- Anacampsis captivella Herrich-Schäffer, 1854; Gelechia sarothamnella Zeller, 1868

Species of moth

Syncopacma captivella is a moth of the family Gelechiidae. It was described by Gottlieb August Wilhelm Herrich-Schäffer in 1854. It is found in Portugal, Spain, France, Belgium, the Netherlands, Switzerland, Germany, Italy, Hungary, Poland, the Czech Republic, Croatia and Romania.

The larvae feed on Cytisus scoparius and Genista legionensis.
