= Syncopacma steppicolella =

Scientific classification
- Kingdom: Animalia
- Phylum: Arthropoda
- Clade: Pancrustacea
- Class: Insecta
- Order: Lepidoptera
- Family: Gelechiidae
- Genus: Syncopacma
- Species: S. steppicolella

Binomial name
- Syncopacma steppicolella Junnilainen, 2010

Species of moth

Syncopacma steppicolella is a moth of the family Gelechiidae. It is found in Russia (the southern Ural). The habitat consists of dry steppe slopes with diversified flora.

The wingspan is 8.5–9.5 mm. Adults are on wing in early June and mid-July, possibly in two generations per year.

The larvae possibly feed on Genista species.

== Etymology ==
The species name refers to the steppe habitat of the species.
