= Syncopacma semicostella =

Scientific classification
- Domain: Eukaryota
- Kingdom: Animalia
- Phylum: Arthropoda
- Class: Insecta
- Order: Lepidoptera
- Family: Gelechiidae
- Genus: Syncopacma
- Species: S. semicostella

Binomial name
- Syncopacma semicostella (Staudinger, 1871)

Synonyms
- Gelechia semicostella Staudinger, 1871; Syncopacma suecicella albicapitella Bidzilya, 1996

Species of moth

Syncopacma semicostella is a moth of the family Gelechiidae. It was described by Otto Staudinger in 1871. It is found in Ukraine and Russia.
