= Syncopacma syncrita =

Scientific classification
- Kingdom: Animalia
- Phylum: Arthropoda
- Class: Insecta
- Order: Lepidoptera
- Family: Gelechiidae
- Genus: Syncopacma
- Species: S. syncrita

Binomial name
- Syncopacma syncrita (Meyrick, 1926)

Synonyms
- Stomopteryx syncrita Meyrick, 1926

Species of moth

Syncopacma syncrita is a moth of the family Gelechiidae. It was described by Edward Meyrick in 1926. It is found in Asia Minor and India.
