= Syncopacma acanthyllidis =

Scientific classification
- Domain: Eukaryota
- Kingdom: Animalia
- Phylum: Arthropoda
- Class: Insecta
- Order: Lepidoptera
- Family: Gelechiidae
- Genus: Syncopacma
- Species: S. acanthyllidis

Binomial name
- Syncopacma acanthyllidis (Walsingham, 1905)

Synonyms
- Aproaerema acanthyllidis Walsingham, 1905

Species of moth

Syncopacma acanthyllidis is a moth of the family Gelechiidae. It was described by Thomas de Grey, 6th Baron Walsingham, in 1905. It is found in Algeria.

The wingspan is 8–9 mm. The forewings are pale olive brown at the base, shading to brownish fuscous a little beyond the middle, where this colour is abruptly terminated by a straight whitish ochreous fascia, narrow on the dorsum, wider and somewhat diffused outward above it to the costa. This fascia is of varying intensity, and in some varieties is almost entirely obliterated by a suffusion of the blackish scales which predominate usually beyond it on the apical fourth. The black scales in ordinary varieties are sprinkled thickly on olive-brown, and accompanied by shining steely metallic scales, each tipped with black, which extend through the base of the grey cilia. The hindwings are pale bluish grey.

The larvae feed on Acanthyllis tragacanthoides.
