= Syncopacma ussuriella =

Scientific classification
- Domain: Eukaryota
- Kingdom: Animalia
- Phylum: Arthropoda
- Class: Insecta
- Order: Lepidoptera
- Family: Gelechiidae
- Genus: Syncopacma
- Species: S. ussuriella

Binomial name
- Syncopacma ussuriella (Caradja, 1920)

Synonyms
- Anacampsis ussuriella Caradja, 1920

Species of moth

Syncopacma ussuriella is a moth of the family Gelechiidae. It was described by Aristide Caradja in 1920. It is found in the Russian Far East.
