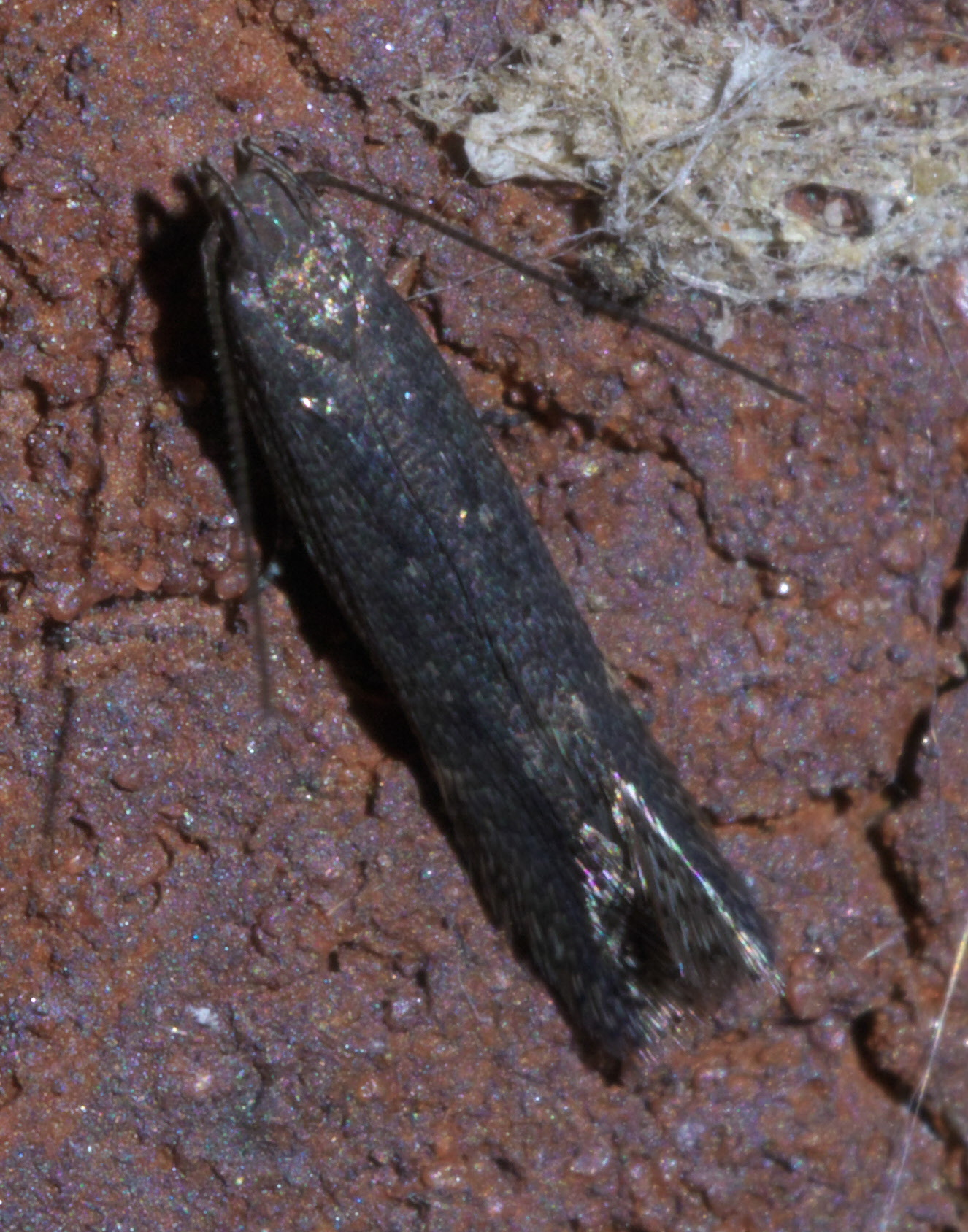

Scientific classification
- Kingdom: Animalia
- Phylum: Arthropoda
- Clade: Pancrustacea
- Class: Insecta
- Order: Lepidoptera
- Family: Gelechiidae
- Genus: Aproaerema
- Species: A. palpilineella

Binomial name
- Aproaerema palpilineella (Chambers, 1875)

Synonyms
- Gelechia palpilineella Chambers, 1875; Syncopacma palpilineella Chambers, 1875

= Aproaerema palpilineella =

Species of moth

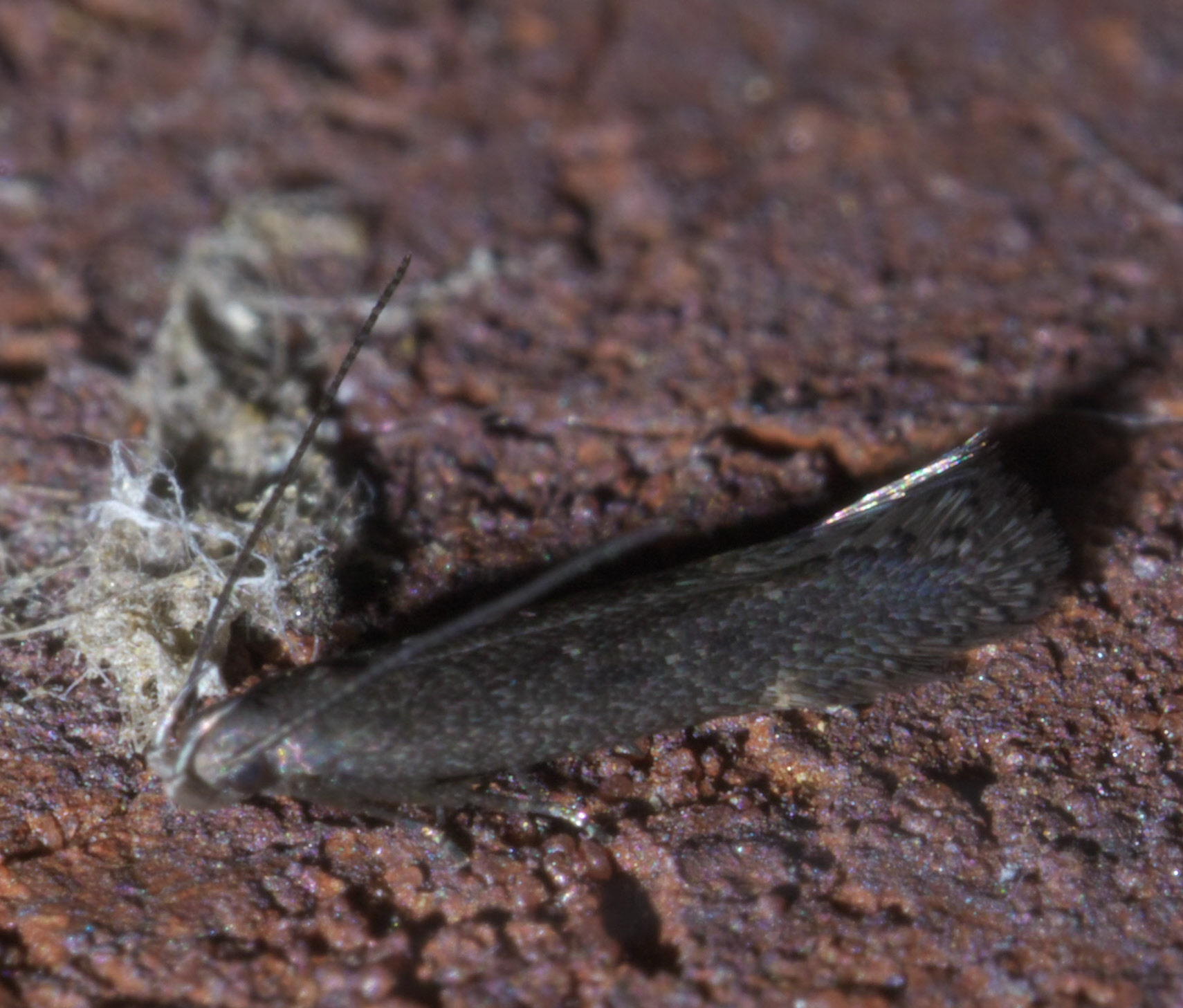
Aproaerema palpilineella, Hodges #2222, Size: 5 mm

Aproaerema palpilineella is a moth of the family Gelechiidae. It was described by Vactor Tousey Chambers in 1875. It is found in North America, where it has been recorded from Georgia, Illinois, Indiana, Kansas, Kentucky, Louisiana, Maine, Mississippi, Ohio, Oklahoma, Ontario, Quebec, Tennessee and Texas.

The larvae feed on Trifolium species and Coronilla varia.

Aproaerema palpilineella was formerly in the genus Syncopacma.
