= Syncopacma mitrella =

Scientific classification
- Domain: Eukaryota
- Kingdom: Animalia
- Phylum: Arthropoda
- Class: Insecta
- Order: Lepidoptera
- Family: Gelechiidae
- Genus: Syncopacma
- Species: S. mitrella

Binomial name
- Syncopacma mitrella (Walsingham, 1905)

Synonyms
- Aproaerema mitrella Walsingham, 1905

Species of moth

Syncopacma mitrella is a moth of the family Gelechiidae. It was described by Thomas de Grey, 6th Baron Walsingham, in 1905. It is found in Algeria.

The wingspan is about 10 mm. The forewings are bronzy fuscous at the base, darkening to deep brownish fuscous towards the middle, clearly and straightly defined along the inner edge of a white transverse fascia, somewhat expanded outward from the dorsum to the costa. Beyond this the dark brownish fuscous colouring is continued to the apex with bright shining pale steel-grey scales, each tipped with black, radiating outwards along the margins at the base of the brownish grey cilia. The hindwings are leaden grey.
