= Syncopacma adenocarpella =

Scientific classification
- Domain: Eukaryota
- Kingdom: Animalia
- Phylum: Arthropoda
- Class: Insecta
- Order: Lepidoptera
- Family: Gelechiidae
- Genus: Syncopacma
- Species: S. adenocarpella

Binomial name
- Syncopacma adenocarpella (Rebel in Hering, 1927)

Synonyms
- Aproaerema adenocarpella Rebel, 1927

Species of moth

Syncopacma adenocarpella is a moth of the family Gelechiidae. It was described by Rebel in 1927. It is found on the Canary Islands.

The larvae feed on Adenocarpus complicatus aureus.
