= Coleophora polonicella =

Scientific classification
- Kingdom: Animalia
- Phylum: Arthropoda
- Clade: Pancrustacea
- Class: Insecta
- Order: Lepidoptera
- Family: Coleophoridae
- Genus: Coleophora
- Species: C. polonicella

Binomial name
- Coleophora polonicella Zeller, 1865

Species of moth

Coleophora polonicella is a moth of the family Coleophoridae. It is found in Lithuania, Poland and Romania.

The wingspan is 9–10 mm. Adults are on wing in June and July.
