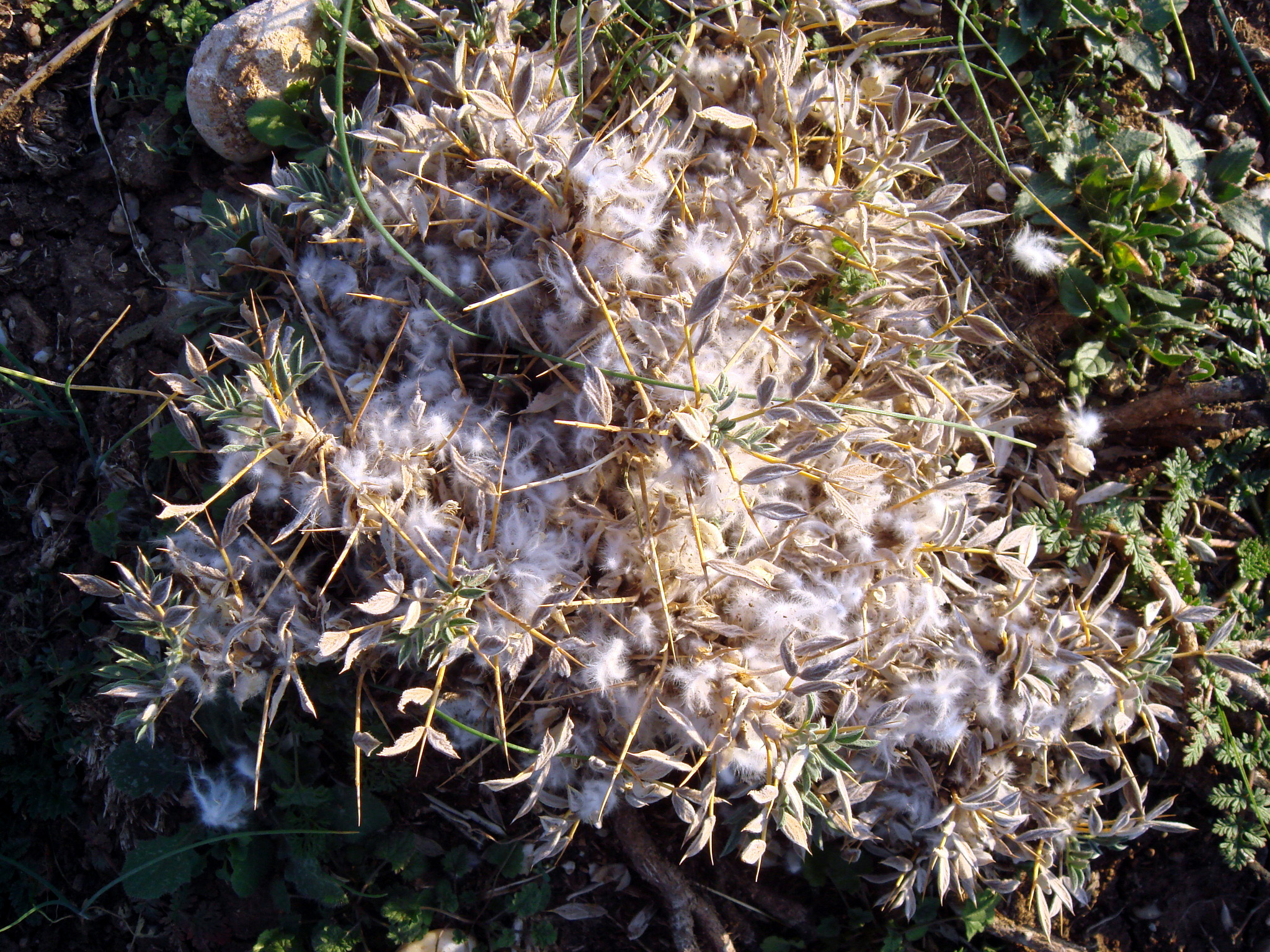

Scientific classification
- Kingdom: Plantae
- Clade: Tracheophytes
- Clade: Angiosperms
- Clade: Eudicots
- Clade: Rosids
- Order: Fabales
- Family: Fabaceae
- Subfamily: Faboideae
- Genus: Astragalus
- Species: A. hamosus

Binomial name
- Astragalus hamosus L.

Synonyms
- Astragalus buceras

= Astragalus hamosus =

Species of plant

Astragalus hamosus, the southern milk vetch or European milk vetch, is a plant in the family Fabaceae.

== Sources ==
This article incorporates text from a free content work. Licensed under CC0 (license statement/permission). Text taken from Astragalus hamosus. Encyclopedia of Life.
