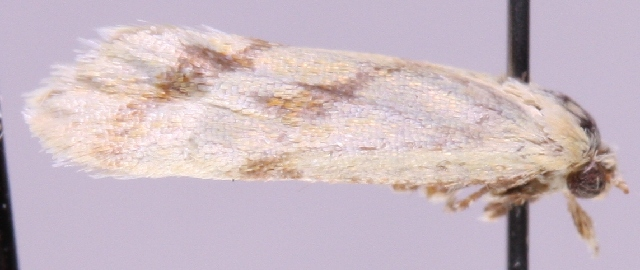

Scientific classification
- Domain: Eukaryota
- Kingdom: Animalia
- Phylum: Arthropoda
- Class: Insecta
- Order: Lepidoptera
- Family: Tortricidae
- Genus: Aethes
- Species: A. fennicana

Binomial name
- Aethes fennicana (Hering, 1924)

Synonyms
- Lozopera fennicana Hering, 1924; Lozopera adelaidae Toll, 1955

= Aethes fennicana =

Species of moth

Aethes fennicana is a species of moth of the family Tortricidae. It is found in northern and central Europe, Iran and China (Xinjiang).

The wingspan is 15–16 millimetres (0.59–0.63 in). Adults are on wing from July to August.
