= Coleophora saturatella =

Scientific classification
- Kingdom: Animalia
- Phylum: Arthropoda
- Class: Insecta
- Order: Lepidoptera
- Family: Coleophoridae
- Genus: Coleophora
- Species: C. saturatella

Binomial name
- Coleophora saturatella Stainton, 1850

Species of moth

Coleophora saturatella is a moth of the family Coleophoridae. It is found from Sweden to the Pyrenees, the Alps and Albania and from Great Britain to Romania. It has also been recorded from southern Russia.

== Description ==
The wingspan is 12–15 mm. Full-grown larvae can be found in June.
