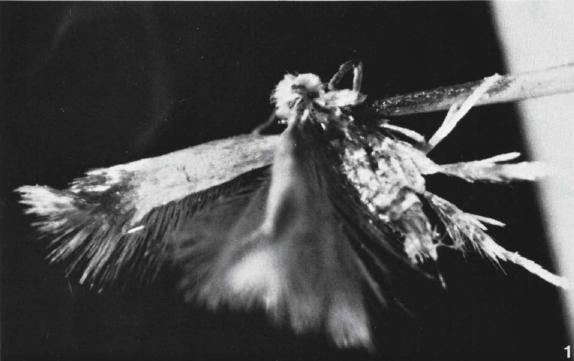

Scientific classification
- Kingdom: Animalia
- Phylum: Arthropoda
- Clade: Pancrustacea
- Class: Insecta
- Order: Lepidoptera
- Family: Nepticulidae
- Genus: Stigmella
- Species: S. zelleriella

Binomial name
- Stigmella zelleriella (Snellen, 1875)

Synonyms
- Nepticula zelleriella Snellen, 1875; Nepticula lappovimella Svensson, 1976; Nepticula repentiella Wolff, 1955

= Stigmella zelleriella =

Species of moth

Stigmella zelleriella is a moth of the family Nepticulidae found in Europe and Russia. It was first described by Pieter Cornelius Tobias Snellen in 1875 (and who is easily confused with Snellen van Vollenhoven). The name "zelleriella" honours the German microlepidopterist Philipp Christoph Zeller.

== Description ==
The wingspan is 4.5–6.2 millimetres (0.18–0.24 in). Adults are on wing from April to September.

The larvae feed on Salix lapponum, Salix repens and Salix repens arenaria, mining the leaves of their host plant.

== Distribution ==
The moth is found from Fennoscandia and northern Russia to the Alps and from Ireland to central Russia. Some authors consider the form lappovimella to be a distinct species. It occurs in northern Fennoscandia.
