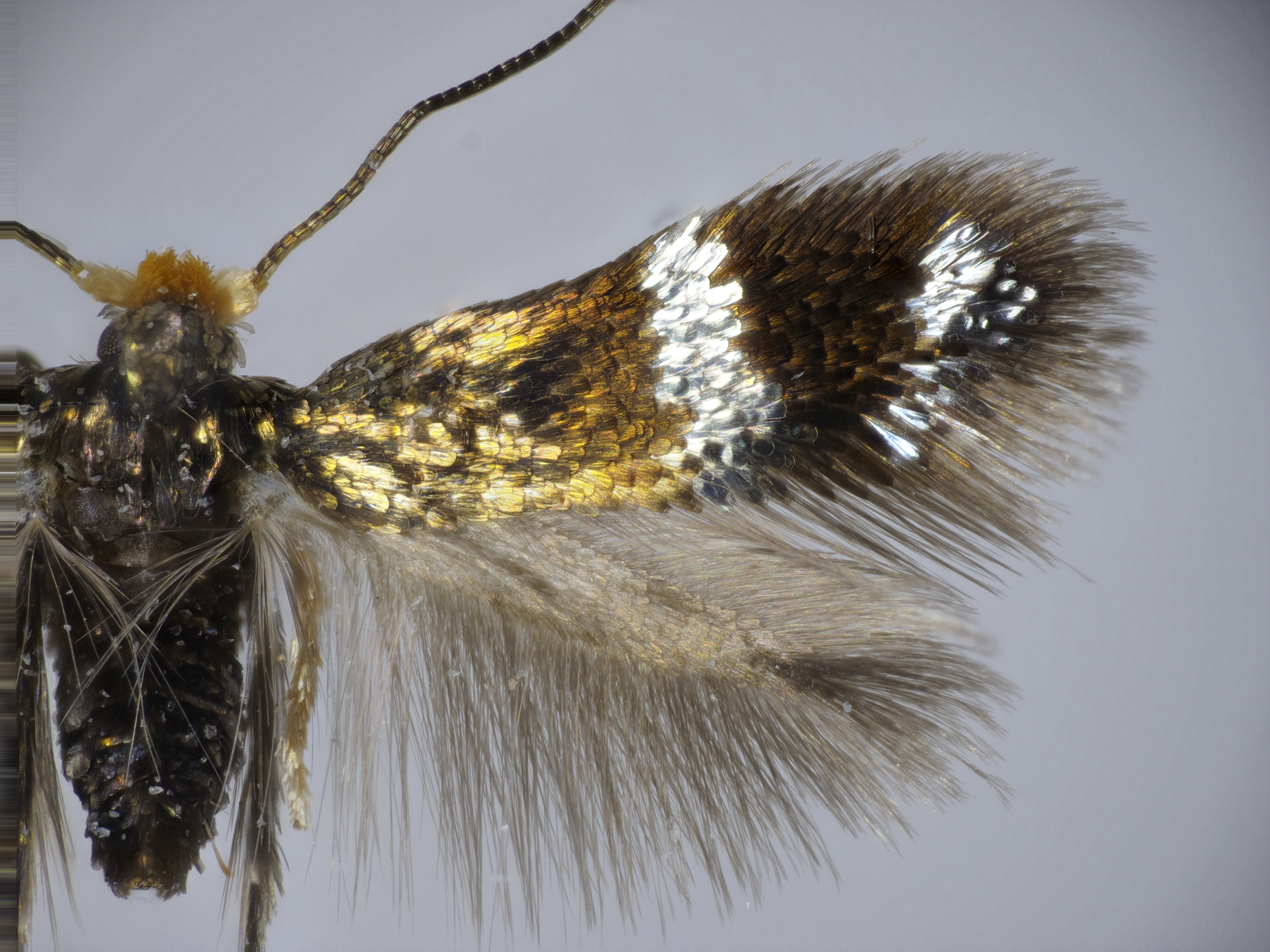

Scientific classification
- Kingdom: Animalia
- Phylum: Arthropoda
- Class: Insecta
- Order: Lepidoptera
- Family: Nepticulidae
- Genus: Stigmella
- Species: S. lediella

Binomial name
- Stigmella lediella (Schleich, 1867)

Synonyms
- Nepticula lediella Schleich, 1867; Stigmella magica Puplesis, 1985; Stigmella rhododendri Puplesis, 1985

= Stigmella lediella =

Species of moth

Stigmella lediella is a moth of the family Nepticulidae. It is found from Fennoscandia to the Alps. It is also present in Japan.

The wingspan is 5–6 mm.

The larvae feed on Rhododendron tomentosum. They mine the leaves of their host plant.
