= Stigmella benanderella =

Scientific classification
- Kingdom: Animalia
- Phylum: Arthropoda
- Class: Insecta
- Order: Lepidoptera
- Family: Nepticulidae
- Genus: Stigmella
- Species: S. benanderella

Binomial name
- Stigmella benanderella (Wolff, 1955)

Synonyms
- Nepticula benanderella Wolff, 1955

Species of moth

Stigmella benanderella is a moth of the family Nepticulidae. It has a scattered distribution in Europe. It has been recorded from Fennoscandia, Denmark, the Baltic region, Hungary and Slovakia.

The larvae feed on Salix phylicifolia, Salix repens and Salix rosmarinifolia. They mine the leaves of their host plant.
