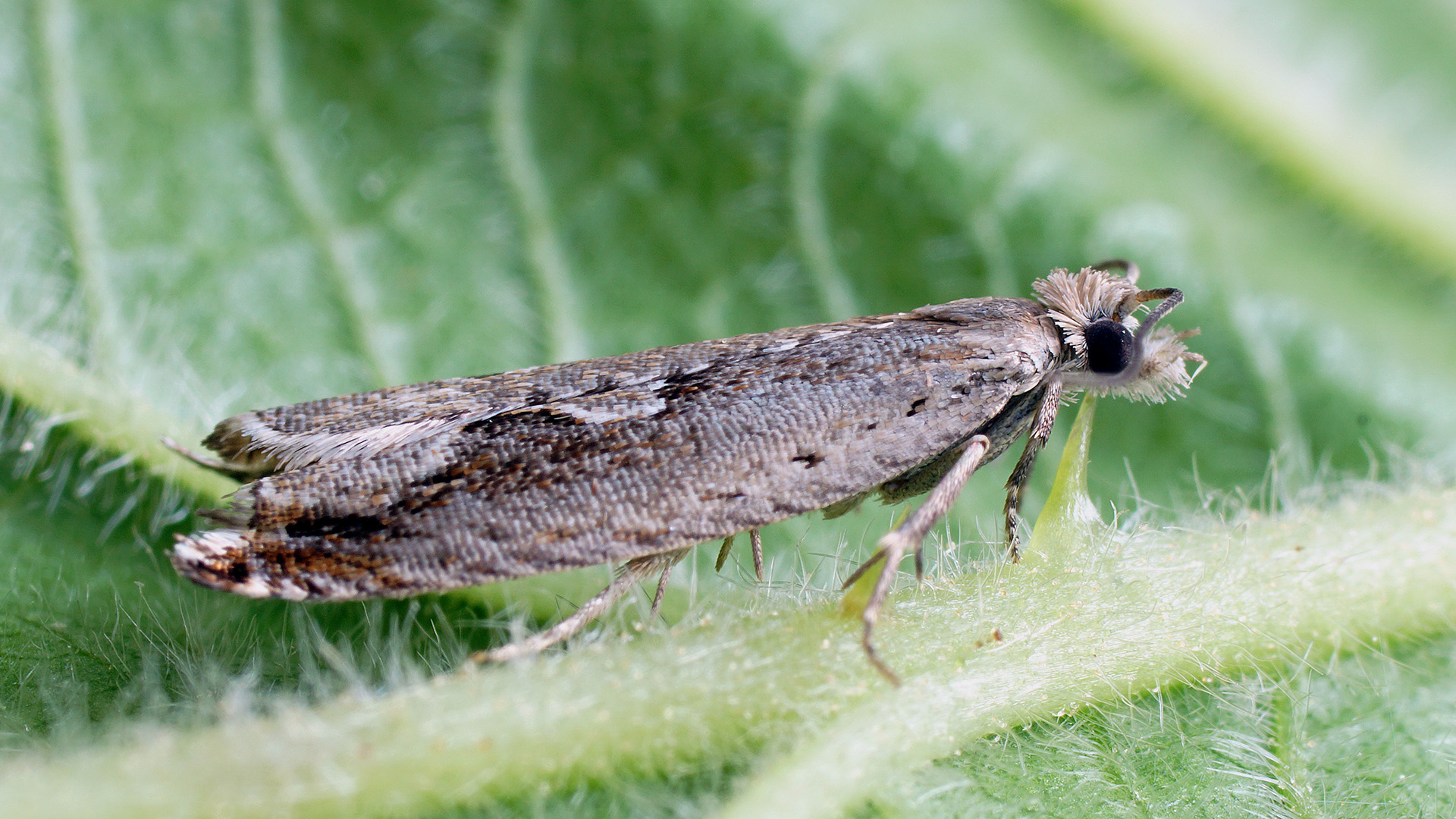

Scientific classification
- Domain: Eukaryota
- Kingdom: Animalia
- Phylum: Arthropoda
- Class: Insecta
- Order: Lepidoptera
- Family: Tortricidae
- Genus: Ancylis
- Species: A. subarcuana

Binomial name
- Ancylis subarcuana (Douglas, 1847)

= Ancylis subarcuana =

Species of moth

Ancylis subarcuana is a species of moth belonging to the family Tortricidae.

It is native to Eurasia.
