= Coleophora scabrida =

Scientific classification
- Kingdom: Animalia
- Phylum: Arthropoda
- Class: Insecta
- Order: Lepidoptera
- Family: Coleophoridae
- Genus: Coleophora
- Species: C. scabrida

Binomial name
- Coleophora scabrida Toll, 1959

Species of moth

Coleophora scabrida is a moth of the family Coleophoridae. It is found from Sweden to Spain and Italy and from France to southern Russia.

The wingspan of the moth is 12–14 mm. Adults are on wing in June and July.
