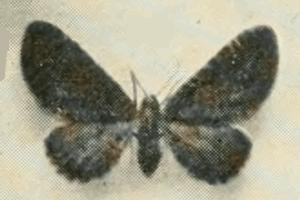

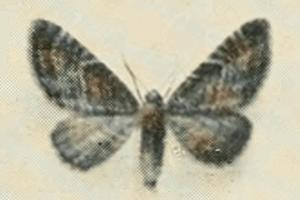

Scientific classification
- Kingdom: Animalia
- Phylum: Arthropoda
- Class: Insecta
- Order: Lepidoptera
- Family: Geometridae
- Genus: Eupithecia
- Species: E. thalictrata

Binomial name
- Eupithecia thalictrata (Püngeler, 1902)

Synonyms
- Tephroclystia thalictrata Püngeler, 1902

= Eupithecia thalictrata =

Species of moth

Eupithecia thalictrata is a moth in the family Geometridae. It is found from Europe (France, Switzerland, Austria, Italy, Poland, Lithuania and Estonia) to the eastern Palearctic realm.

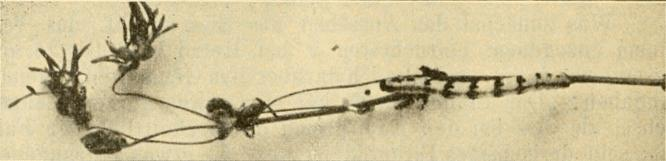
Larva

The wingspan is 18–20 mm. Adults are on wing from April to June.

The larvae feed on Thalictrum species (including Thalictrum foetidum and Thalictrum minus). Larvae can be found from June to July.

== Subspecies ==
- Eupithecia thalictrata thalictrata
- Eupithecia thalictrata ijimai Inoue, 1963 (Russian Far East, Japan)
