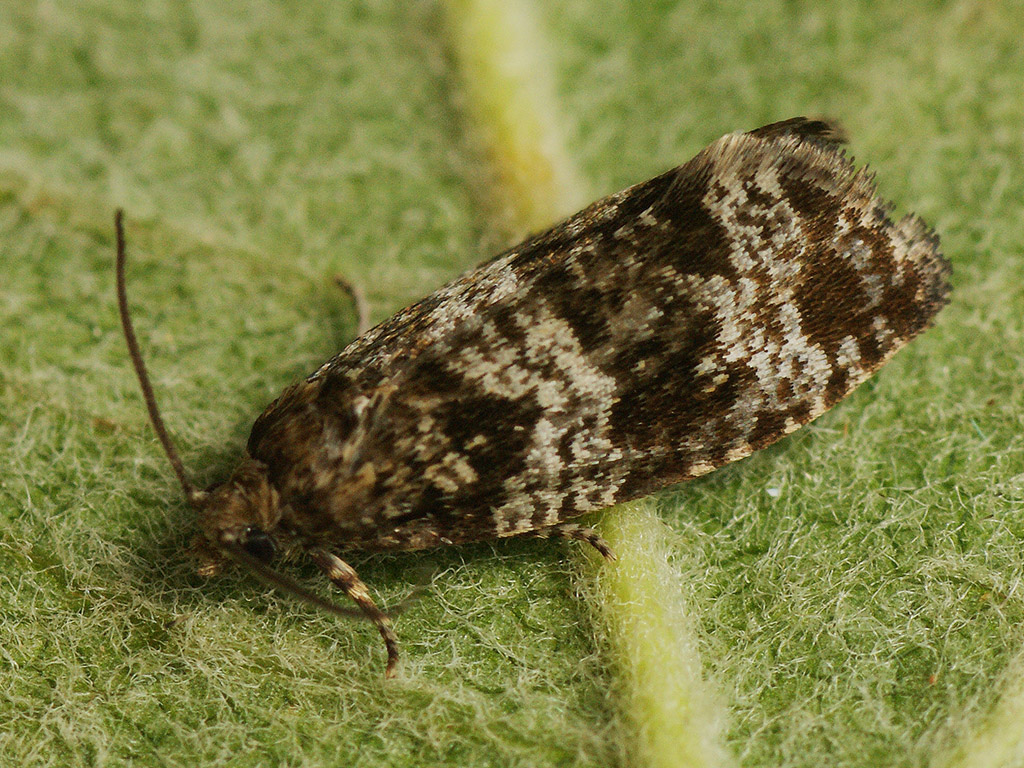

Scientific classification
- Domain: Eukaryota
- Kingdom: Animalia
- Phylum: Arthropoda
- Class: Insecta
- Order: Lepidoptera
- Family: Tortricidae
- Genus: Phiaris
- Species: P. dissolutana

Binomial name
- Phiaris dissolutana (Stange, 1866)

= Phiaris dissolutana =

Species of moth

Phiaris dissolutana is a species of moth belonging to the family Tortricidae.

It is native to Europe.
