= Coleophora uliginosella =

Scientific classification
- Kingdom: Animalia
- Phylum: Arthropoda
- Class: Insecta
- Order: Lepidoptera
- Family: Coleophoridae
- Genus: Coleophora
- Species: C. uliginosella

Binomial name
- Coleophora uliginosella Glitz, 1872

Species of moth

Coleophora uliginosella is a moth of the family Coleophoridae. It is found from Fennoscandia and northern Russia to the Pyrenees and Italy and from France to the Baltic states and Poland.

The larvae feed on Vaccinium uliginosum. Full-grown larvae can be found in autumn.
