= Ectoedemia klimeschi =

Scientific classification
- Kingdom: Animalia
- Phylum: Arthropoda
- Class: Insecta
- Order: Lepidoptera
- Family: Nepticulidae
- Genus: Ectoedemia
- Species: E. klimeschi

Binomial name
- Ectoedemia klimeschi (Skala, 1933)

Synonyms
- Nepticula klimeschi Skala, 1933; Stigmella niculescui Nemes, 1970

Species of moth

Ectoedemia klimeschi is a moth of the family Nepticulidae. It is found in eastern and south-eastern Europe, where it is especially common in the Danube basin, from western Germany to Romania. It has also been recorded from eastern Germany, Poland, Switzerland and northern Italy.

The wingspan is 6–8.2 mm. Adults are on wing in June and July. There is one generation per year.

The larvae feed on Populus alba. They mine the leaves of their host plant.
