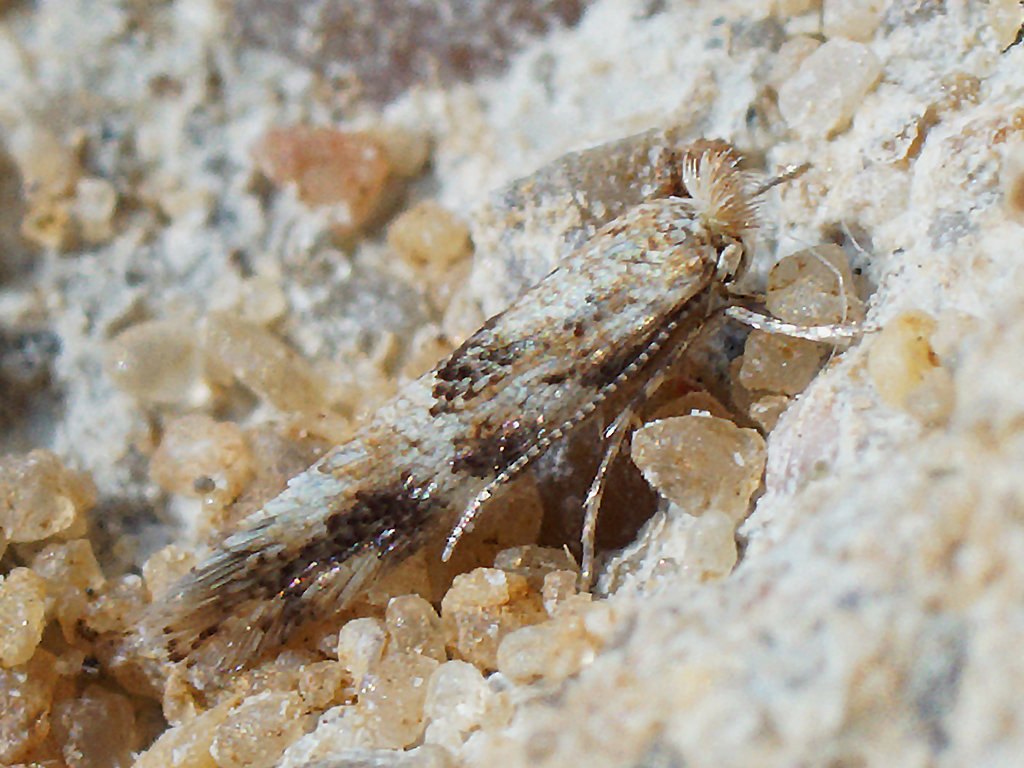

Scientific classification
- Domain: Eukaryota
- Kingdom: Animalia
- Phylum: Arthropoda
- Class: Insecta
- Order: Lepidoptera
- Family: Gracillariidae
- Genus: Phyllonorycter
- Species: P. agilella

Binomial name
- Phyllonorycter agilella (Zeller, 1846)

Synonyms
- Lithocolletis agilella Zeller, 1846

= Phyllonorycter agilella =

Species of moth

Phyllonorycter agilella is a moth of the family Gracillariidae. It is found in Latvia central Russia, Pyrenees, Italy and Bulgaria and from France to eastern Russia.

Its larvae feed on Ulmus glabra, Ulmus laevis and Ulmus minor, mining the leaves of their host plant.
