= Coleophora plumbella =

Scientific classification
- Kingdom: Animalia
- Phylum: Arthropoda
- Class: Insecta
- Order: Lepidoptera
- Family: Coleophoridae
- Genus: Coleophora
- Species: C. plumbella

Binomial name
- Coleophora plumbella Kanerva, 1941

Species of moth

Coleophora plumbella is a moth of the family Coleophoridae. It is found from Fennoscandia to Romania.

The wingspan is 9–10 mm. Adults are on wing in June and July.

The larvae feed on Vaccinium uliginosum. They probably create a composite leaf case. Larvae can be found from late August to spring.
