= Coleophora lewandowskii =

Scientific classification
- Kingdom: Animalia
- Phylum: Arthropoda
- Class: Insecta
- Order: Lepidoptera
- Family: Coleophoridae
- Genus: Coleophora
- Species: C. lewandowskii

Binomial name
- Coleophora lewandowskii (Toll, 1953)

Synonyms
- Eupista lewandowskii Toll, 1953

Species of moth

Coleophora lewandowskii is a moth of the family Coleophoridae. It is found in Poland and Lithuania.
