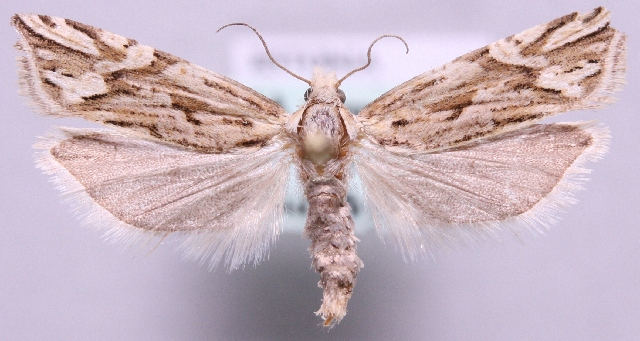

Scientific classification
- Kingdom: Animalia
- Phylum: Arthropoda
- Clade: Pancrustacea
- Class: Insecta
- Order: Lepidoptera
- Family: Tortricidae
- Genus: Eucosma
- Species: E. messingiana

Binomial name
- Eucosma messingiana (Fischer v. Röslerstamm, 1837)

Synonyms
- Grapholitha messingiana Fischer v. Röslerstamm, 1837

= Eucosma messingiana =

Species of moth

Eucosma messingiana is a species of moth of the family Tortricidae. It is found in China (Hebei, Inner Mongolia), Mongolia, Russia and Europe, where it has been recorded from Germany, the Czech Republic, Denmark, Hungary, Poland, the Baltic region, Sweden and Finland. The habitat consists of sandy areas.

The wingspan is 18–28 mm. Adults are on wing from August to September in one generation per year.

The larvae feed on Artemisia campestris. Larvae can be found from September to May.
