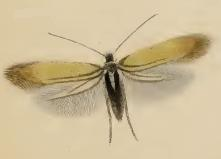

Scientific classification
- Kingdom: Animalia
- Phylum: Arthropoda
- Class: Insecta
- Order: Lepidoptera
- Family: Nepticulidae
- Genus: Stigmella
- Species: S. lonicerarum

Binomial name
- Stigmella lonicerarum (Frey, 1856)

Synonyms
- Nepticula lonicerarum Frey, 1856

= Stigmella lonicerarum =

Species of moth

Stigmella lonicerarum is a moth of the family Nepticulidae. It is found from Sweden and Finland to the Pyrenees, Italy and Bulgaria, and from France to Russia.

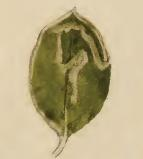
Mined honesuckle leaf

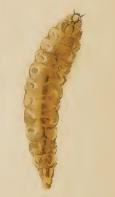
Larva

The wingspan is 4–5 mm.
