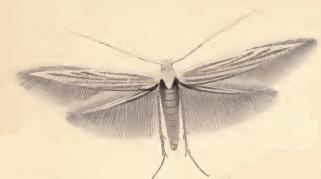

Scientific classification
- Kingdom: Animalia
- Phylum: Arthropoda
- Clade: Pancrustacea
- Class: Insecta
- Order: Lepidoptera
- Family: Coleophoridae
- Genus: Coleophora
- Species: C. gnaphalii

Binomial name
- Coleophora gnaphalii Zeller, 1839

= Coleophora gnaphalii =

Species of moth

Coleophora gnaphalii is a moth of the family Coleophoridae. It is found from Sweden and the Baltic States to the Pyrenees, the Alps and Romania and from France to Russia.

Sprig of "Gnaphalium arenarium" (=Helichrysum arenarium) with two larva-cases attached

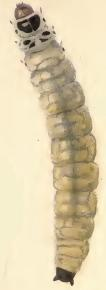
Larva

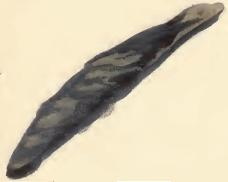
Larval case

The wingspan is 9–12 mm. Adults are on wing from July to August.
