= Coleophora murinella =

Scientific classification
- Kingdom: Animalia
- Phylum: Arthropoda
- Class: Insecta
- Order: Lepidoptera
- Family: Coleophoridae
- Genus: Coleophora
- Species: C. murinella

Binomial name
- Coleophora murinella Tengstrom, 1848

Species of moth

Coleophora murinella is a moth of the family Coleophoridae. It is found from Fennoscandia and northern Russia to the Alps and from Germany to the Baltic states and Poland.
