= Acleris nigrilineana =

Scientific classification
- Kingdom: Animalia
- Phylum: Arthropoda
- Class: Insecta
- Order: Lepidoptera
- Family: Tortricidae
- Genus: Acleris
- Species: A. nigrilineana

Binomial name
- Acleris nigrilineana Kawabe, 1963

Species of moth

Acleris nigrilineana is a species of moth of the family Tortricidae. It is found in Korea, Japan, the Russian Far East and Denmark, Norway, Sweden, Finland, Poland, European Russia, Estonia and Latvia.

The wingspan is 23 mm for both males and females.

The larvae feed on Abies sachalinensis and Abies alba.

== Taxonomy ==
Some sources list the species as a subspecies of Acleris abietana.
