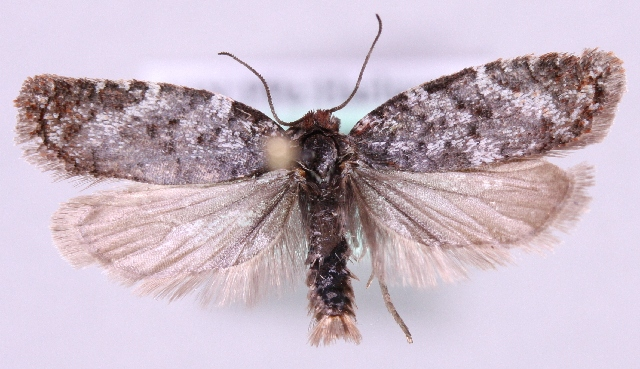

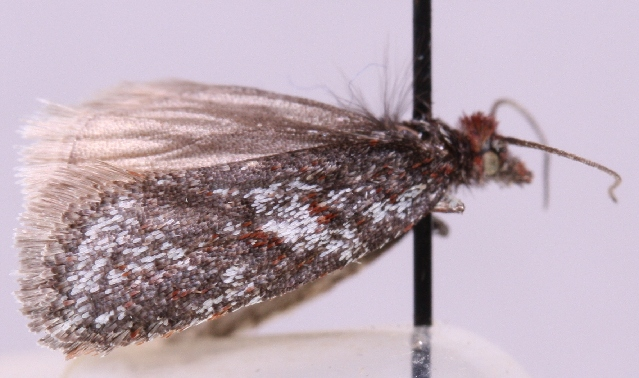

Scientific classification
- Domain: Eukaryota
- Kingdom: Animalia
- Phylum: Arthropoda
- Class: Insecta
- Order: Lepidoptera
- Family: Tortricidae
- Genus: Acleris
- Species: A. fimbriana

Binomial name
- Acleris fimbriana (Thunberg & Becklin, 1791)

Synonyms
- Tortrix fimbriana Thunberg & Becklin, 1791; Acalla albistrigana Petersen, 1924; Acleris fimbriana ab. costistrigana Obraztsov, 1957; Peronea crocopepla Meyrick, 1922; Acleris fimbriana ab. fasciana Obraztsov, 1957; Tortrix lubricana Mann, 1867; pulverana Herrich-Schaffer, 1849; Tortrix (Teras) pulverana Herrich-Schaffer, 1851; Peronea tephromorpha Meyrick, 1930; Acleris fimbriana ab. unicolorana Obraztsov, 1957

= Acleris fimbriana =

Species of moth

Acleris fimbriana, the yellow tortrix moth, is a species of moth of the family Tortricidae. It is found in France, Germany, Denmark, Italy, Slovakia, Hungary, Romania, Poland, Norway, Sweden, Finland, the Baltic region, Ukraine and Russia. It is also found in China and South Korea.

The wingspan is 18–20 mm. Adults are on wing from August to May.

The larvae feed on Prunus spinosa, Vaccinium uliginosum, Betula nana, Malus domestica and Spiraea species. Larvae can be found from May to June and in August.
