= Scythris penicillata =

Scientific classification
- Kingdom: Animalia
- Phylum: Arthropoda
- Class: Insecta
- Order: Lepidoptera
- Family: Scythrididae
- Genus: Scythris
- Species: S. penicillata

Binomial name
- Scythris penicillata (Chretien, 1900)

Species of moth

Scythris penicillata is a moth belonging to the family Scythrididae. The species was first described by Pierre Chrétien in 1900.

It is native to Eurasia.
