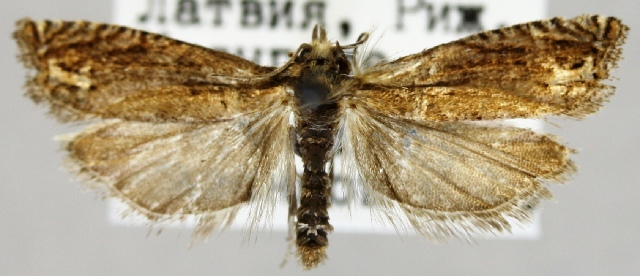

Scientific classification
- Kingdom: Animalia
- Phylum: Arthropoda
- Clade: Pancrustacea
- Class: Insecta
- Order: Lepidoptera
- Family: Tortricidae
- Genus: Eucosma
- Species: E. scorzonerana

Binomial name
- Eucosma scorzonerana (Benander, 1942)

Synonyms
- Epiblema scorzonerana Benander, 1942

= Eucosma scorzonerana =

Species of moth

Eucosma scorzonerana is a species of moth of the family Tortricidae. It is found in China (Jilin, Gansu, Xinjiang), Russia and Kazakhstan and Europe, where it has been recorded from Italy, the Czech Republic, Slovakia, Norway, Sweden, Finland, Estonia, and Latvia.

The wingspan is 18–22 mm. Adults are on wing from May to June.

The larvae feed on Scorzonera species.
