= Acleris obtusana =

Scientific classification
- Domain: Eukaryota
- Kingdom: Animalia
- Phylum: Arthropoda
- Class: Insecta
- Order: Lepidoptera
- Family: Tortricidae
- Genus: Acleris
- Species: A. obtusana

Binomial name
- Acleris obtusana (Eversmann, 1844)

Synonyms
- Teras obtusana Eversmann, 1844; Peronea fuscana Barnes & Busck, 1920; Acleris fuscana

Species of moth

Acleris obtusana, the small aspen leaftier moth, is a species of moth of the family Tortricidae. It is found in Norway, Sweden, Finland, Estonia and Latvia. It is also found in Russia and North America, where it has been recorded from Alberta, Indiana, Maine, Michigan, Montana, New Hampshire, New York, Ontario, Vermont and Wisconsin.

The wingspan is 15–19 mm. Adults are on wing from August to May.

The larvae feed on Populus species (including Populus alba, Populus grandidentata, Populus tremuloides), Alnus incana, Betula papyrifera and Salix species.
