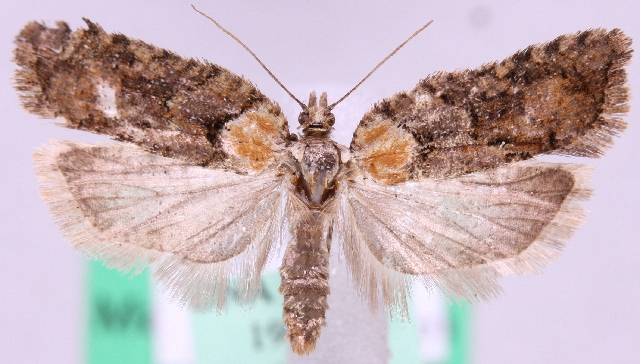

Scientific classification
- Kingdom: Animalia
- Phylum: Arthropoda
- Class: Insecta
- Order: Lepidoptera
- Family: Tortricidae
- Genus: Acleris
- Species: A. abietana

Binomial name
- Acleris abietana (Hubner, [1819–1822])

Synonyms
- Tortrix abietana Hubner, [1819–1822]; Tortrix confixana Hubner, [1819–1822]; Acleris abietana ab. costialba Obraztsov, 1957; Acleris abietana ab. dorsialba Obraztsov, 1957; Teras erebana Guenee, 1845; Teras lutiplaga Rebel, in Staudinger & Wocke, 1901; Acalla mitterbergeriana Hauder, 1914; Acalla nigricana Hauder, 1913; Tortrix opacana Hubner, [1832–1833]; Acleris nigrilineana vikeniana Opheim, 1968

= Acleris abietana =

Species of moth

Acleris abietana, the Perth button, is a species of moth of the family Tortricidae. It is found in Europe, where it has been recorded from Great Britain, Ireland, France, Belgium, the Netherlands, Germany, Denmark, Austria, Switzerland, Italy, the Czech Republic, Slovakia, Slovenia, Poland, Hungary and Russia. The habitat consists of coniferous woodlands.

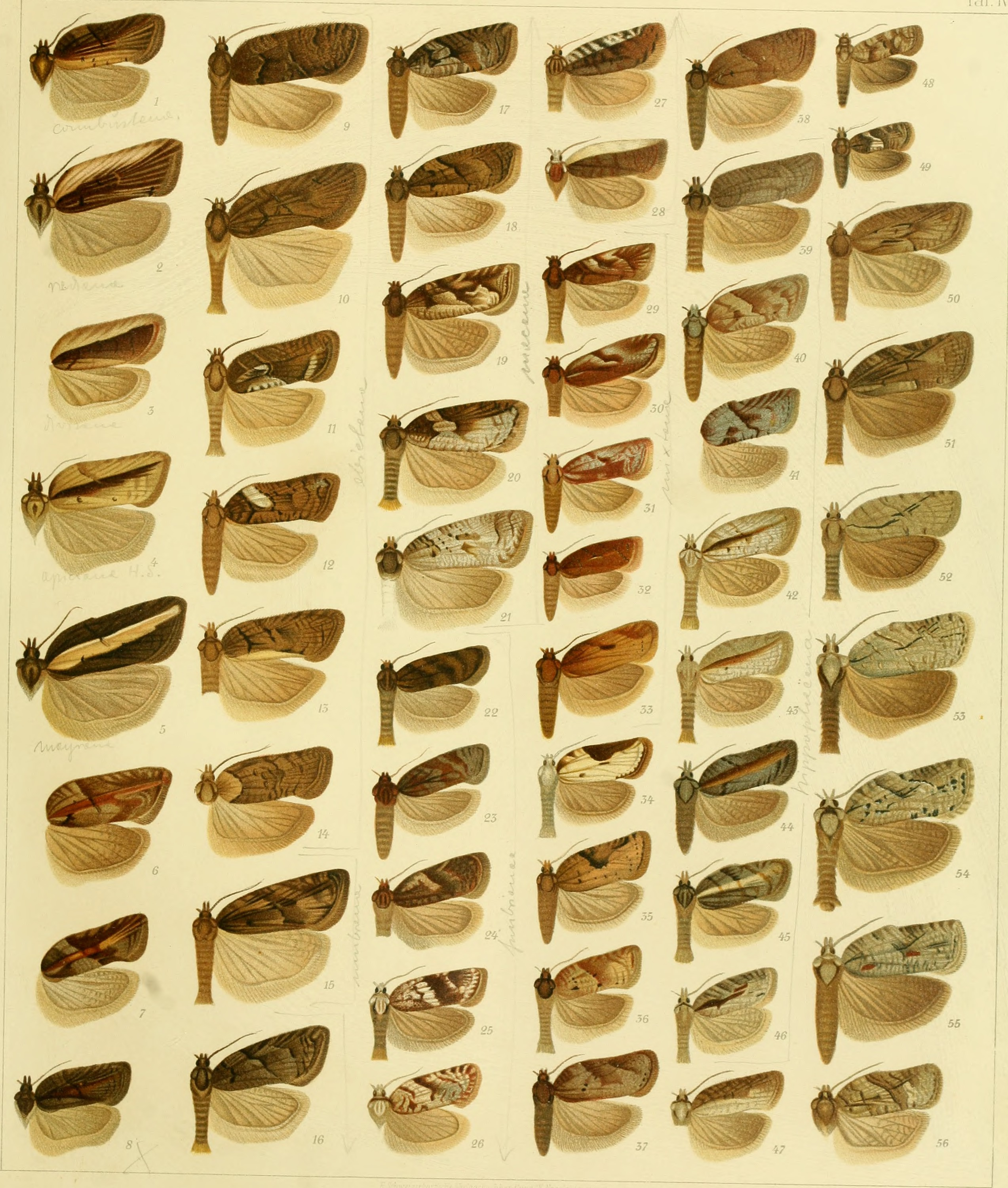
Forms of A. abietana, A. hastiana and related species

The wingspan is 21–25 mm. Very similar to forms of Acleris hastiana but the forewing has more pronounced scale-tufts. Certain identification requires genitalia dissection. Julius von Kennel gives a full description.

Adults are on wing in one generation from August to late October and, after hibernation, from mid-March to May.

The larvae feed on Abies alba, Pinus and Picea species (including Picea excelsa and Picea abies). They live in a loose spinning between the needles of their host plant. Larvae can be found from June to July.
