= Stigmella svenssoni =

Scientific classification
- Kingdom: Animalia
- Phylum: Arthropoda
- Class: Insecta
- Order: Lepidoptera
- Family: Nepticulidae
- Genus: Stigmella
- Species: S. svenssoni

Binomial name
- Stigmella svenssoni (Johansson, 1971)

Synonyms
- Nepticula svenssoni Johansson, 1971

Species of moth

Stigmella svenssoni is a moth of the family Nepticulidae. It is widespread, but localised in the northern half of Europe, with records from Norway, Sweden, Finland, Denmark, Latvia, the Netherlands, Germany, Slovakia, Hungary and France. There are two isolated records from northern Italy and northern Greece. Only leafmines are recorded from Ireland.

The wingspan is 6–7 mm.The adults have an orange head.The collar is creamy white and the eyecaps are cream.The forewings have a dark brownish ground colour with a distinct purplish sheen at the tip fifth.

The larva mines Quercus species.
