= Coleophora absinthii =

Scientific classification
- Kingdom: Animalia
- Phylum: Arthropoda
- Clade: Pancrustacea
- Class: Insecta
- Order: Lepidoptera
- Family: Coleophoridae
- Genus: Coleophora
- Species: C. absinthii

Binomial name
- Coleophora absinthii Wocke, 1877

Species of moth

Coleophora absinthii is a moth of the family Coleophoridae. It is found from France, east to southern Russia and from Fennoscandia south to Switzerland and Romania. It has also been recorded from Sicily.

The wingspan is 14–17 mm.

The larvae feed on Artemisia absinthium. They feed from within a case.
