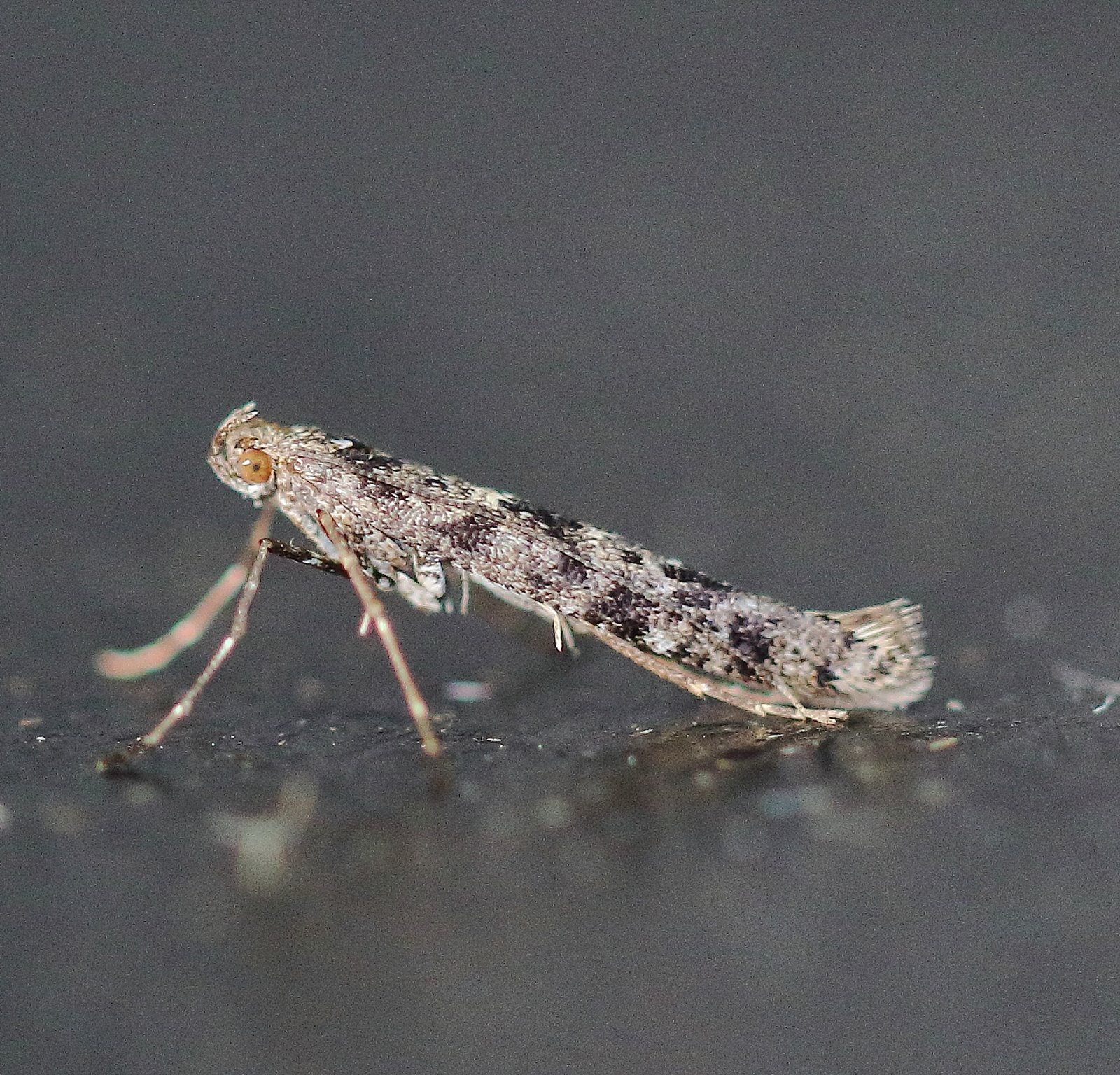

Scientific classification
- Domain: Eukaryota
- Kingdom: Animalia
- Phylum: Arthropoda
- Class: Insecta
- Order: Lepidoptera
- Family: Gracillariidae
- Genus: Caloptilia
- Species: C. suberinella

Binomial name
- Caloptilia suberinella (Tengström, 1848)

Synonyms
- Gracilaria suberinella Tengström, 1848; Caloptilia proteella (Frey, 1884)

= Caloptilia suberinella =

Species of moth

Caloptilia suberinella is a moth of the family Gracillariidae. It is known from the Netherlands, Sweden, Norway, Finland, Denmark, Germany, Switzerland, Poland, Latvia, Estonia, Ukraine, Russia and China. It was recently recorded from North America (British Columbia).

The wingspan is 14–15 mm.
