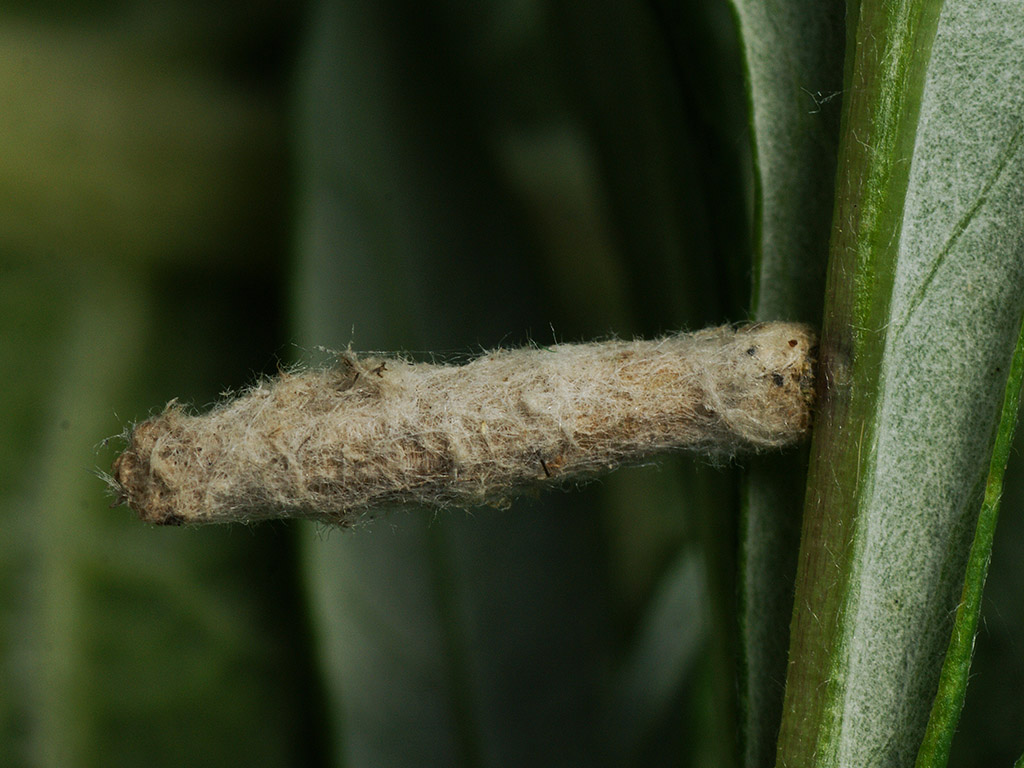

Scientific classification
- Kingdom: Animalia
- Phylum: Arthropoda
- Class: Insecta
- Order: Lepidoptera
- Family: Coleophoridae
- Genus: Coleophora
- Species: C. succursella

Binomial name
- Coleophora succursella Herrich-Schaffer, 1855

= Coleophora succursella =

Species of moth

Coleophora succursella is a moth of the family Coleophoridae. It is found from Fennoscandia to the Pyrenees and Italy and from France to Poland and Slovakia.

The larvae feed on Achillea millefolium, Artemisia absinthium, Artemisia campestris and Artemisia vulgaris. Larvae can be found from October to June.
