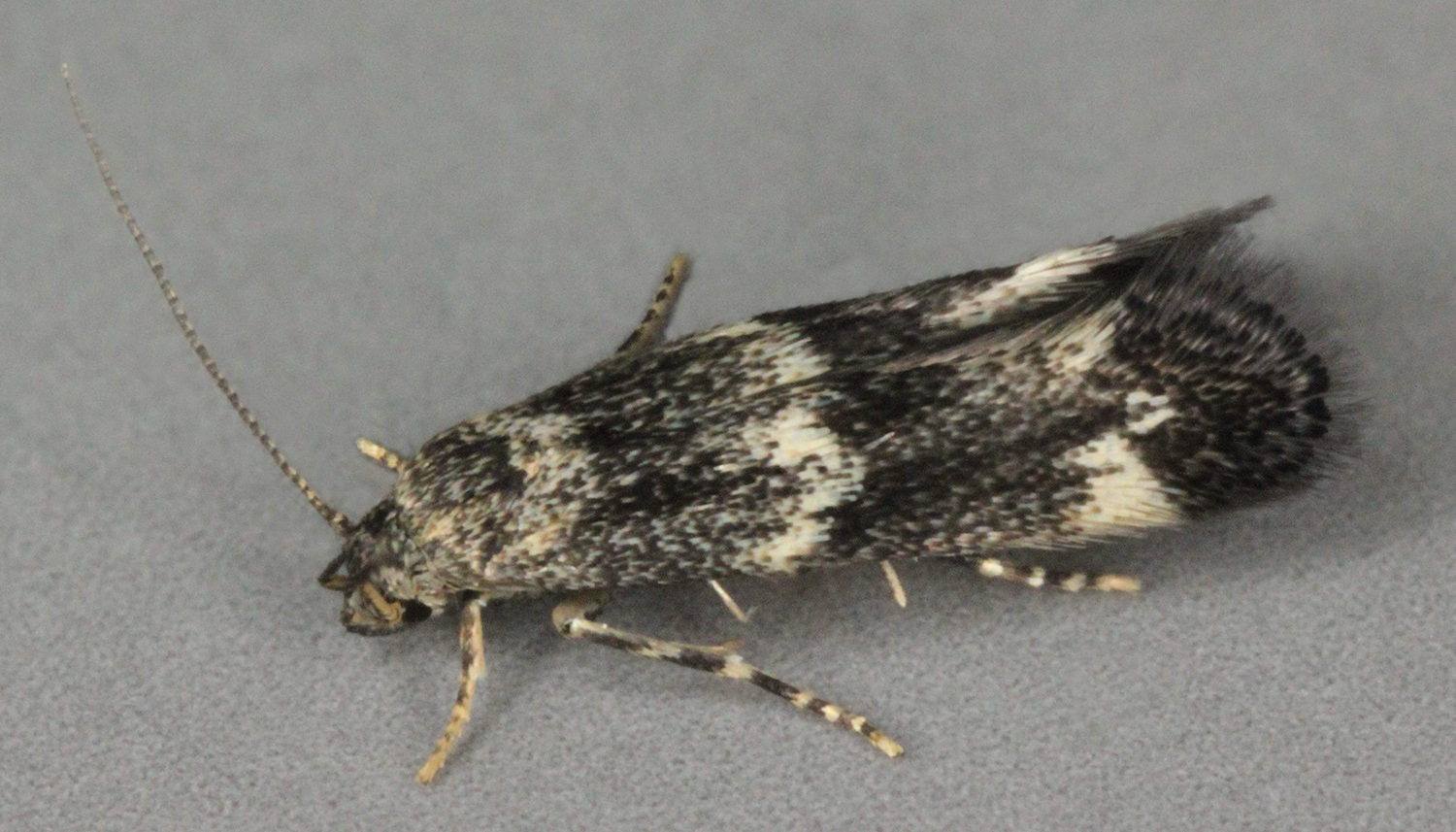
- Elachista poae Deeside, North Wales

Scientific classification
- Domain: Eukaryota
- Kingdom: Animalia
- Phylum: Arthropoda
- Class: Insecta
- Order: Lepidoptera
- Family: Elachistidae
- Genus: Elachista
- Species: E. poae

Binomial name
- Elachista poae Stainton, 1855

= Elachista poae =

Species of moth

Elachista poae is a moth of the family Elachistidae found in Europe.

== Description ==
The wingspan is 9–12 mm. The head is blackish. Forewings are blackish, somewhat pale-sprinkled, basal area somewhat lighter; an obscure fascia before middle, angulated outwards in middle and inwards on fold, a small ill -defined tornal spot, a more distinct one on costa opposite, and traces of an angular mark in disc beyond and connecting these whitish, in female more distinct. Hindwings are dark grey. The larva is whitish -yellowish; head and two spots on 2 pale brown.

Adults are on wing from April to May and from June to August.

The larvae feed on reed sweet-grass (Glyceria maxima), mining the leaves of their host plant. Larvae can be found from April to May and again from July to August.

== Distribution ==
It is found from Fennoscandia and the Baltic region to Belgium, the Alps and Hungary and from Ireland to Romania.
