= Coleophora hackmani =

Scientific classification
- Kingdom: Animalia
- Phylum: Arthropoda
- Clade: Pancrustacea
- Class: Insecta
- Order: Lepidoptera
- Family: Coleophoridae
- Genus: Coleophora
- Species: C. hackmani

Binomial name
- Coleophora hackmani (Toll, 1953)

Synonyms
- Coleophora ciconiella Benander, 1939, nec Zeller 1849 (Misidentification); Eupista hackmani Toll, 1953; Coleophora hackmani Toll, 1956 (Junior secondary homonym of Eupista hackmani Toll, 1953); Coleophora clarissa Falkovitsh, 1977

Species of moth

Coleophora hackmani is a moth of the family Coleophoridae. It is found from northern Europe to the eastern part of the Palearctic realm. It has also been recorded from the Iberian Peninsula.

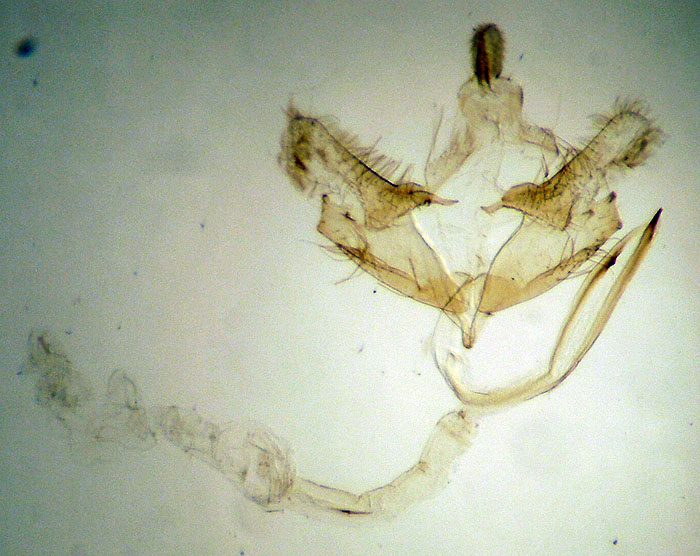

The wingspan is 12–15 mm.

The larvae feed on Silene nutans.
