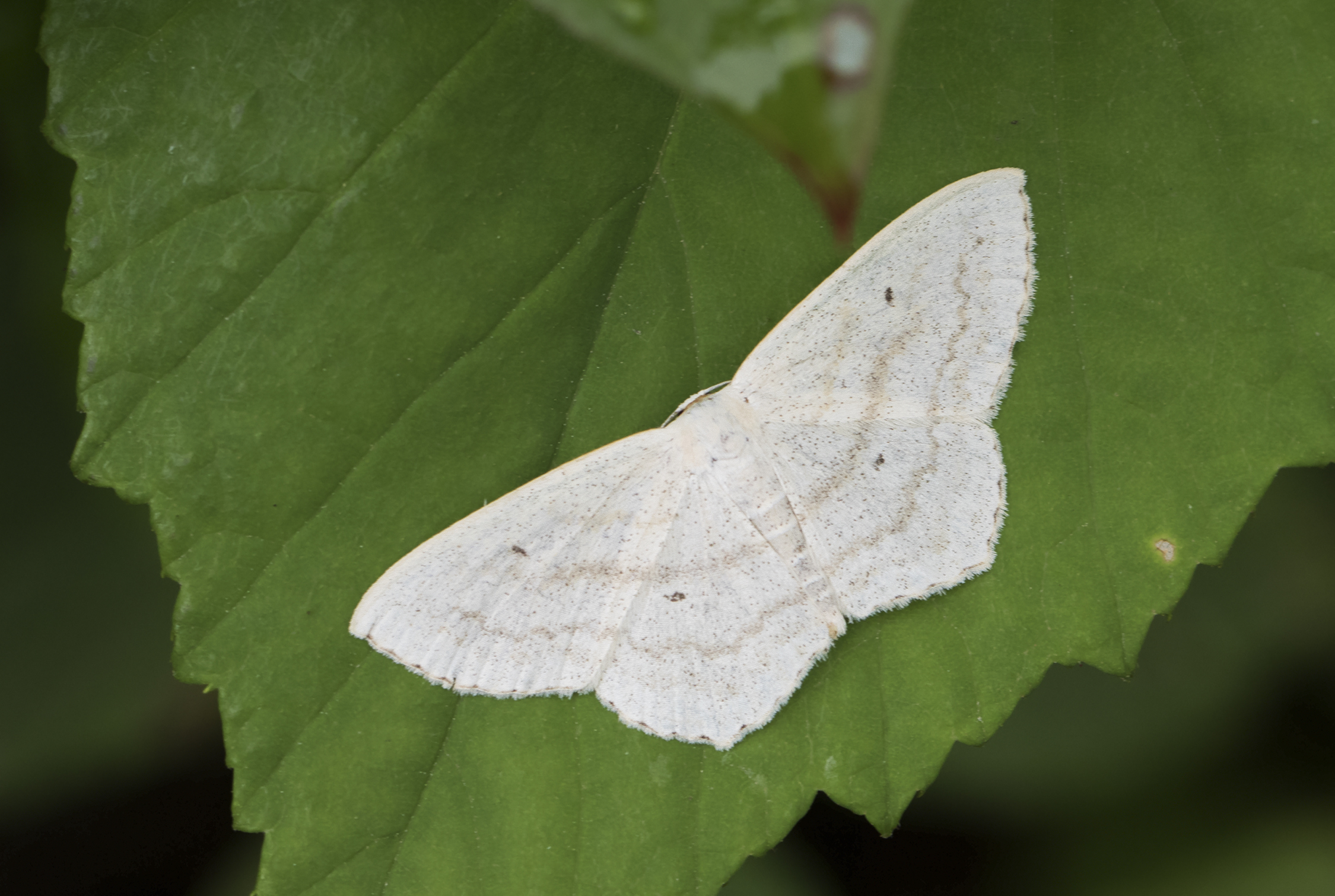

Scientific classification
- Kingdom: Animalia
- Phylum: Arthropoda
- Clade: Pancrustacea
- Class: Insecta
- Order: Lepidoptera
- Family: Geometridae
- Genus: Scopula
- Species: S. flaccidaria

Binomial name
- Scopula flaccidaria (Zeller, 1852)

Synonyms
- Geometra flaccidaria Zeller, 1852

= Scopula flaccidaria =

Species of geometer moth in subfamily Sterrhinae

Scopula flaccidaria is a moth of the family Geometridae. It was described by Zeller in 1852. It is found in the Asia Minor, Russia and south-eastern Europe.

The wingspan is 19–23 millimetres (0.75–0.91 in).
