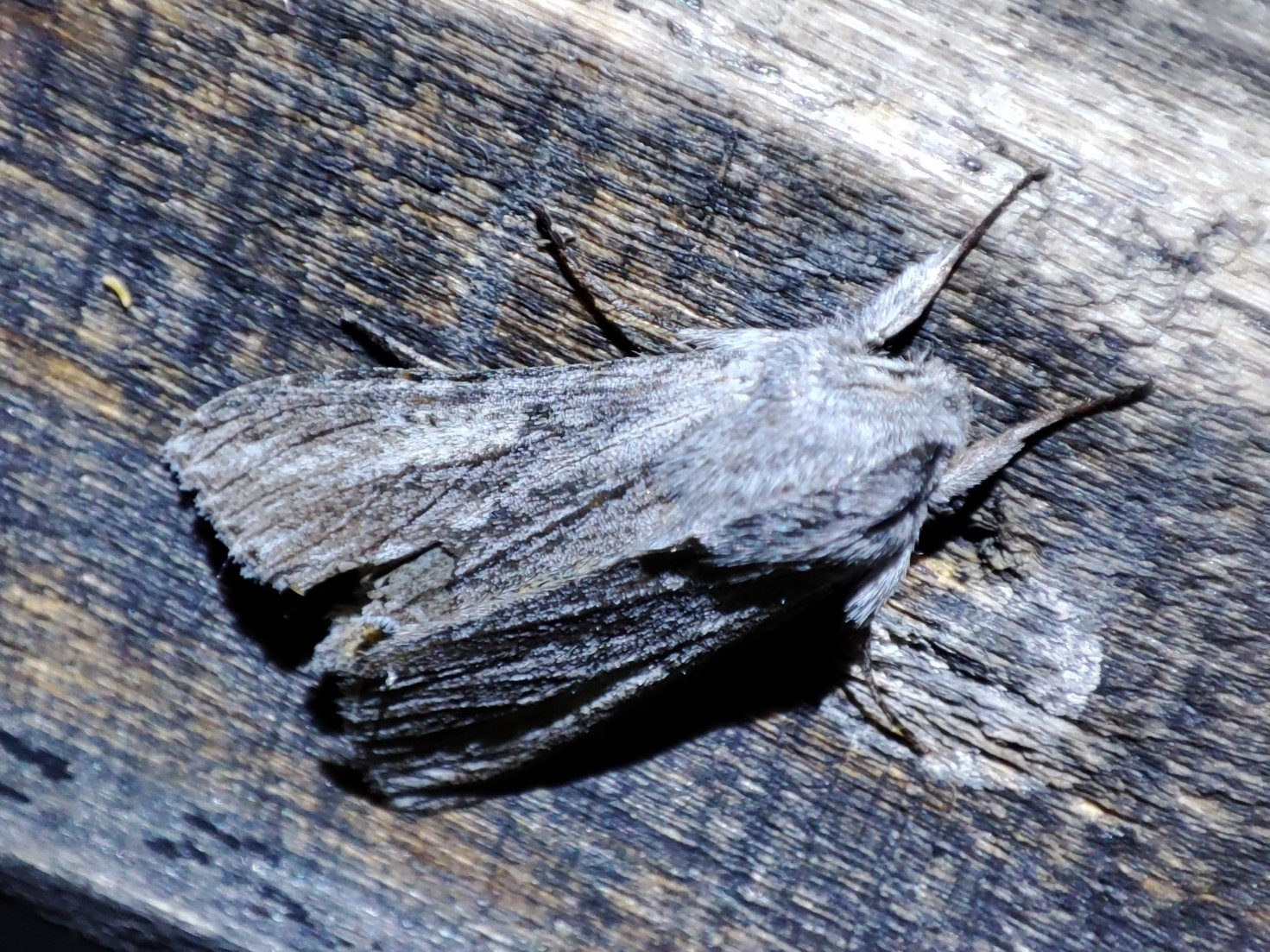

Scientific classification
- Kingdom: Animalia
- Phylum: Arthropoda
- Class: Insecta
- Order: Lepidoptera
- Superfamily: Noctuoidea
- Family: Noctuidae
- Genus: Cucullia
- Species: C. praecana

Binomial name
- Cucullia praecana Eversmann, 1844

= Cucullia praecana =

Species of moth

Cucullia praecana is a species of moth in the family Noctuidae. The species was first described by Eduard Friedrich Eversmann in 1844.

It is native to northern Europe.
