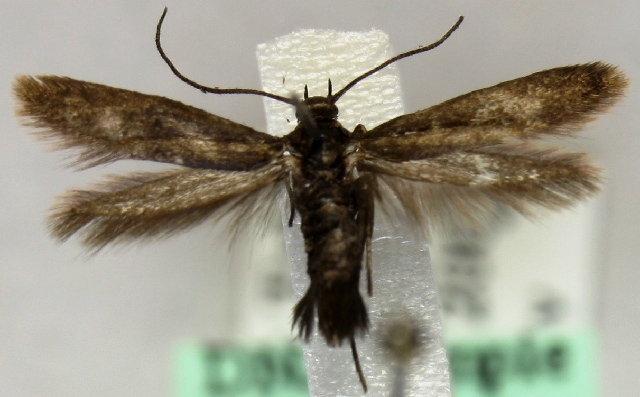

Scientific classification
- Domain: Eukaryota
- Kingdom: Animalia
- Phylum: Arthropoda
- Class: Insecta
- Order: Lepidoptera
- Family: Scythrididae
- Genus: Parascythris; Hannemann, 1960
- Species: P. muelleri

Binomial name
- Parascythris muelleri (J. J. Mann, 1871)

Synonyms
- Butalis muelleri J. J. Mann, 1871; Scythris tolli Rebel, 1938; Scythris muelleri var. unicolorata Osthelder, 1951

= Parascythris =

Genus of moths

Parascythris is a monotypic moth genus in the family Scythrididae erected by Hans-Joachim Hannemann in 1960. Its only species, Parascythris muelleri, was described by Josef Johann Mann in 1871. It is found in Germany, Austria, the Czech Republic, Slovakia, Hungary, Bulgaria, Romania, Poland, Latvia, Belarus, Ukraine and Russia.

The wingspan is about 11 mm.

The larvae possibly feed on Thymus species.
