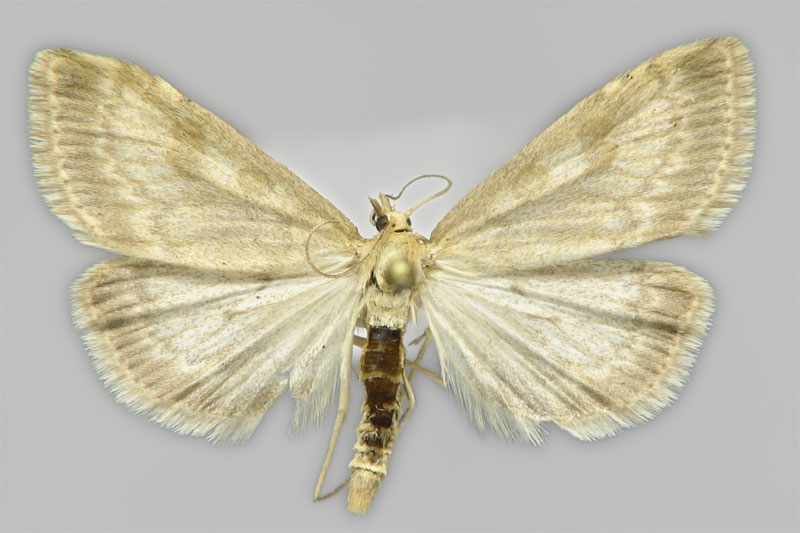

Scientific classification
- Domain: Eukaryota
- Kingdom: Animalia
- Phylum: Arthropoda
- Class: Insecta
- Order: Lepidoptera
- Family: Crambidae
- Genus: Udea
- Species: U. decrepitalis

Binomial name
- Udea decrepitalis (Herrich-Schäffer, 1848)

Synonyms
- Botys decrepitalis Herrich-Schaffer, 1848; Pionea decrepitalis ab. leucoalis Strand, 1920

= Udea decrepitalis =

Species of moth

Udea decrepitalis is a moth of the family Crambidae described by Gottlieb August Wilhelm Herrich-Schäffer in 1848. It is found in most of Europe (except Iceland, Ireland, the Iberian Peninsula, the Benelux, Denmark, Greece, Bulgaria, Croatia, Hungary and Ukraine), east into Russia.

The wingspan is 23–27 mm. Adults are on wing from May to July.

The larvae feed on Dryopteris carthusiana.
