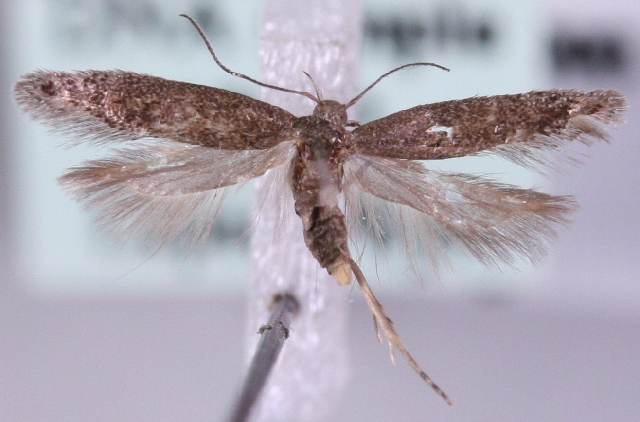

Scientific classification
- Kingdom: Animalia
- Phylum: Arthropoda
- Clade: Pancrustacea
- Class: Insecta
- Order: Lepidoptera
- Family: Gelechiidae
- Genus: Scrobipalpa
- Species: S. murinella

Binomial name
- Scrobipalpa murinella (Duponchel, 1843)

Synonyms
- Lita murinella Duponchel, 1843; Gelechia culminicolella Staudinger, 1871; Gelechia excelsa Frey, 1880

= Scrobipalpa murinella =

Species of moth

Scrobipalpa murinella is a moth in the family Gelechiidae. It was described by Philogène Auguste Joseph Duponchel in 1843. It is found in the Alps, Carpathian Mountains, Ireland, Great Britain, northern Europe and Ukraine.

The wingspan is 9–10 mm (0.35–0.39 in). It resembles other Scrobipalpa. Certain identification requires microscopic examination of the genitalia.

Adults are on wing from April to June.
