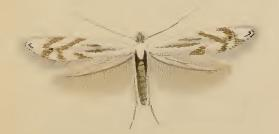

Scientific classification
- Kingdom: Animalia
- Phylum: Arthropoda
- Clade: Pancrustacea
- Class: Insecta
- Order: Lepidoptera
- Family: Bucculatricidae
- Genus: Bucculatrix
- Species: B. ratisbonensis

Binomial name
- Bucculatrix ratisbonensis Stainton, 1861

= Bucculatrix ratisbonensis =

Species of moth

Bucculatrix ratisbonensis is a moth of the family Bucculatricidae. It is found from Fennoscandia to Italy and from Germany to Russia. It was described in 1861 by Henry Tibbats Stainton.

Piece of gnawed on Artemisia campestris leaf, with cocoon at the right

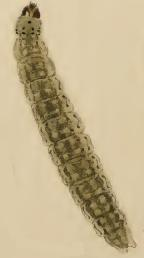
Larva

The wingspan is 7–8 mm. There are two to three generations per year with adults on wing from May to August.

The larvae feed on Artemisia campestris and Artemisia vulgaris. They mine the leaves of their host plant.
