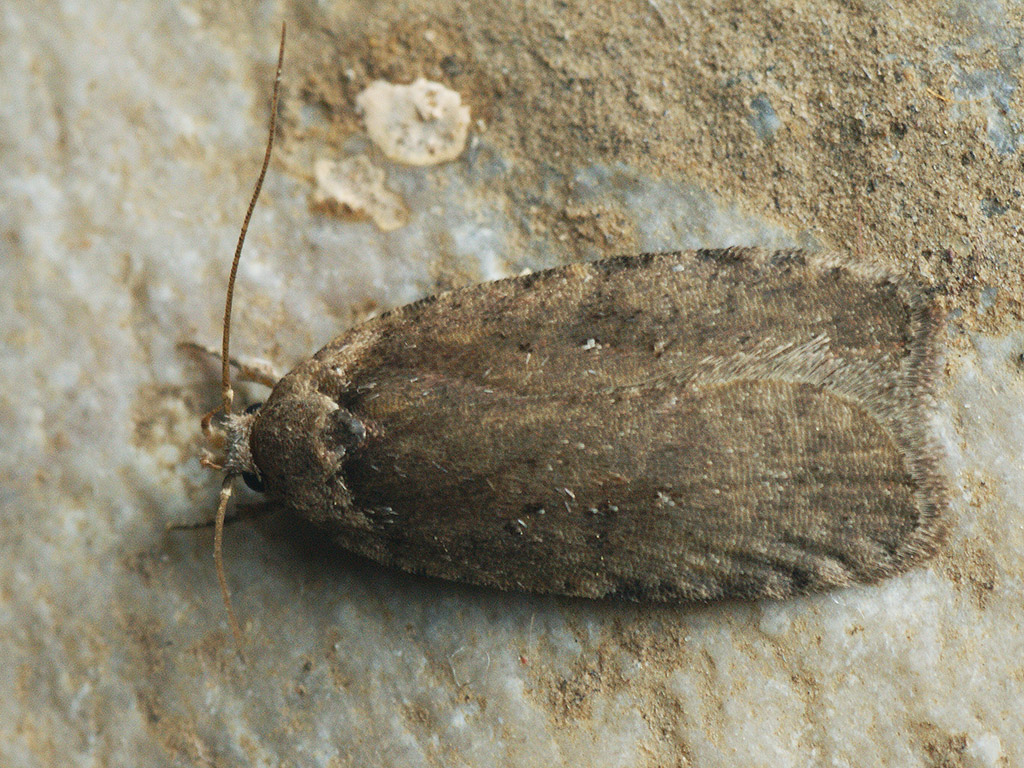

Scientific classification
- Kingdom: Animalia
- Phylum: Arthropoda
- Clade: Pancrustacea
- Class: Insecta
- Order: Lepidoptera
- Family: Depressariidae
- Genus: Agonopterix
- Species: A. multiplicella

Binomial name
- Agonopterix multiplicella (Erschoff, 1877)

Synonyms
- Depressaria multiplicella Erschoff, 1877; Agonopterix klimeschi Hannemann, 1953

= Agonopterix multiplicella =

Species of moth

Agonopterix multiplicella is a moth of the family Depressariidae. It is found from Italy, Austria, Slovakia, Poland, Ukraine, the Baltic region, Denmark, Sweden, Finland and Russia to Japan.

The wingspan is 18–19 mm.

The larvae feed on Artemisia vulgaris.
