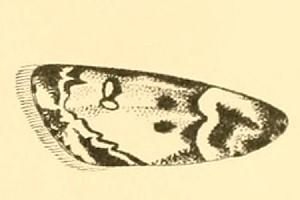

Scientific classification
- Kingdom: Animalia
- Phylum: Arthropoda
- Clade: Pancrustacea
- Class: Insecta
- Order: Lepidoptera
- Family: Crambidae
- Genus: Eudonia
- Species: E. laetella

Binomial name
- Eudonia laetella (Zeller, 1846)

Synonyms
- Eudorea laetella Zeller, 1846

= Eudonia laetella =

Species of moth

Eudonia laetella is a species of moth in the family Crambidae described by Philipp Christoph Zeller in 1846. It is found in Fennoscandia, the Baltic region, Belarus, Russia, Poland, the Czech Republic, Slovakia, Hungary, Romania, Bosnia and Herzegovina, the Republic of Macedonia, Greece, Slovenia, Austria, Switzerland, Italy, Germany and Belgium.

The wingspan is 16–20 mm. Adults are on wing in January and from June to August.

The larvae feed on moss on trunks.
