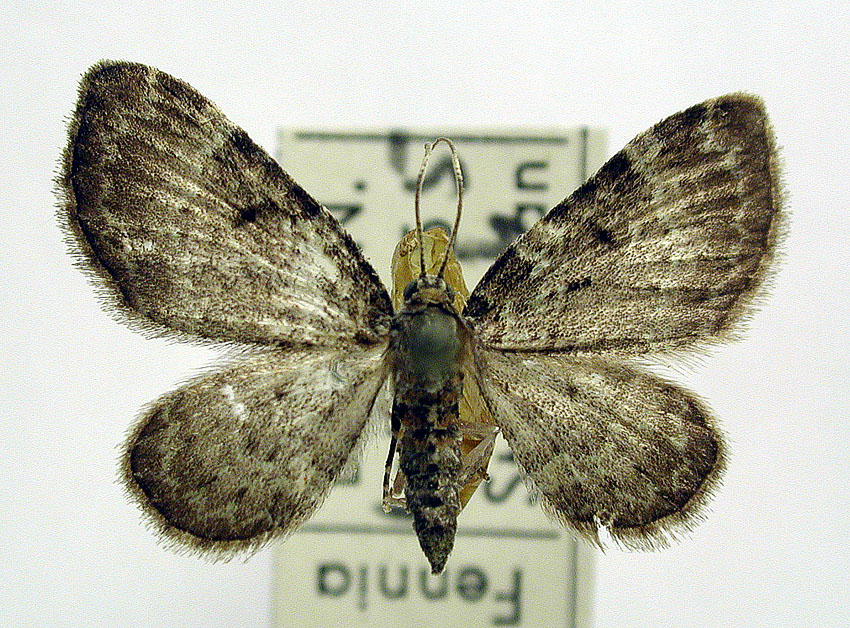

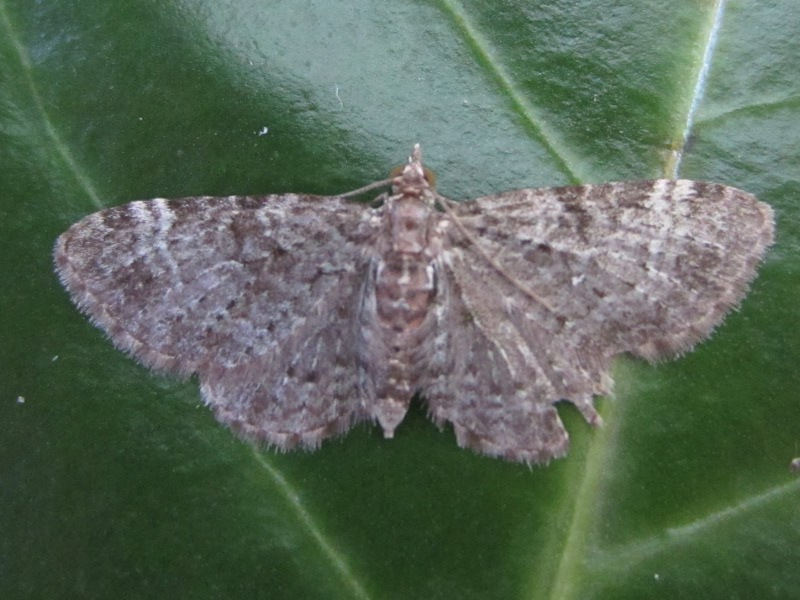

Scientific classification
- Domain: Eukaryota
- Kingdom: Animalia
- Phylum: Arthropoda
- Class: Insecta
- Order: Lepidoptera
- Family: Geometridae
- Genus: Pasiphila
- Species: P. chloerata

Binomial name
- Pasiphila chloerata (Mabille, 1870)

Synonyms
- Eupithecia chloerata Mabille, 1870; Rhinoprora chloerata; Chloroclystis chloerata; Eupithecia consueta Butler, 1879; Eupithecia horticolaria Fuchs, 1892; Calliclystis chloerata f. nigrofasciata Dietze, 1913; Chloroclystis bowringi Prout, 1958

= Pasiphila chloerata =

Species of moth

Pasiphila chloerata, the sloe pug, is a moth in the family Geometridae. It is found from Europe to the Amur Region and central Asia.

The wingspan is 17–19 millimetres (0.67–0.75 in). Adults are on wing from May to June. There is one generation per year.

The larvae feed on Amelanchier and Prunus species (including Prunus padus, Prunus virginiana and Prunus spinosa). Larvae can be found from April to May. It overwinters as an egg.

== Subspecies ==
- Pasiphila chloerata chloerata
- Pasiphila chloerata bowringi (Prout, 1958)
