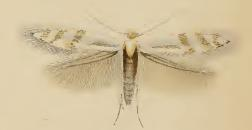

Scientific classification
- Kingdom: Animalia
- Phylum: Arthropoda
- Clade: Pancrustacea
- Class: Insecta
- Order: Lepidoptera
- Family: Bucculatricidae
- Genus: Bucculatrix
- Species: B. gnaphaliella

Binomial name
- Bucculatrix gnaphaliella (Treitschke, 1833)

Synonyms
- Elachista gnaphaliella Treitschke, 1833

= Bucculatrix gnaphaliella =

Species of moth

Bucculatrix gnaphaliella is a moth of the family Bucculatricidae. It is found across much of Europe, ranging from Sweden and the Baltic region to the Pyrenees, Italy and Romania and from France to Russia. It was described by Georg Friedrich Treitschke in 1833.

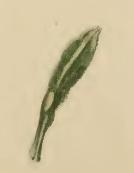
Leaf of Gnaphalium arenarium with mine and cocoon

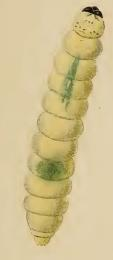
Larva

The wingspan is 8–9 mm.

The larvae feed on Gnaphalium and Helichrysum arenarium. They initially mine the leaves of their host plant and later bore into the shoots. Larvae of the first generation can be found from autumn to May of the following year. Second generation larvae are found in July and live freely. They are pale yellow.
