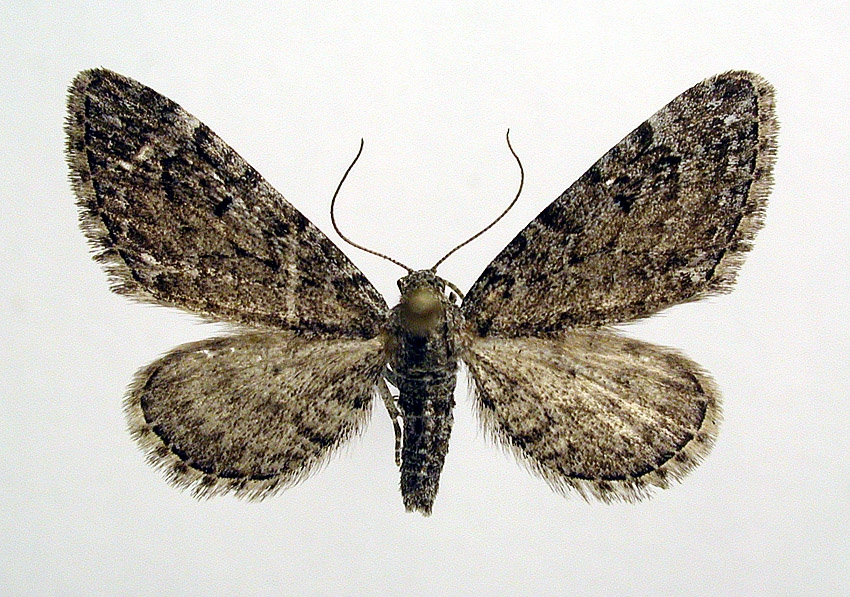

Scientific classification
- Domain: Eukaryota
- Kingdom: Animalia
- Phylum: Arthropoda
- Class: Insecta
- Order: Lepidoptera
- Family: Geometridae
- Genus: Eupithecia
- Species: E. gelidata

Binomial name
- Eupithecia gelidata Möschler, 1860

Synonyms
- Eupithecia lagganata Taylor, 1910; Eupithecia compactata Taylor, 1910; Eupithecia nordeggensis Cassino & Swett, 1922; Eupithecia hyperboreata Staudinger, 1861; Tephroclystia flebilis Hulst, 1900

= Eupithecia gelidata =

Species of moth

Eupithecia gelidata is a moth of the family Geometridae. It is known from northern North America, Greenland, northern Russia, Scandinavia and northern central Europe.

The wingspan is 17–22 mm. There is one generation per year with adults on wing from June to mid July.

The larvae feed on Rhododendron tomentosum but possibly also other plants, because the species has been found in areas of Norway and Sweden where R. tomentosum is not present. Larvae can be found from mid July to August. It overwinters as a pupa.

== Subspecies ==
- Eupithecia gelidata gelidata
- Eupithecia gelidata hyperboreata Staudinger, 1861 (Europe, northern Russia, Greenland)
