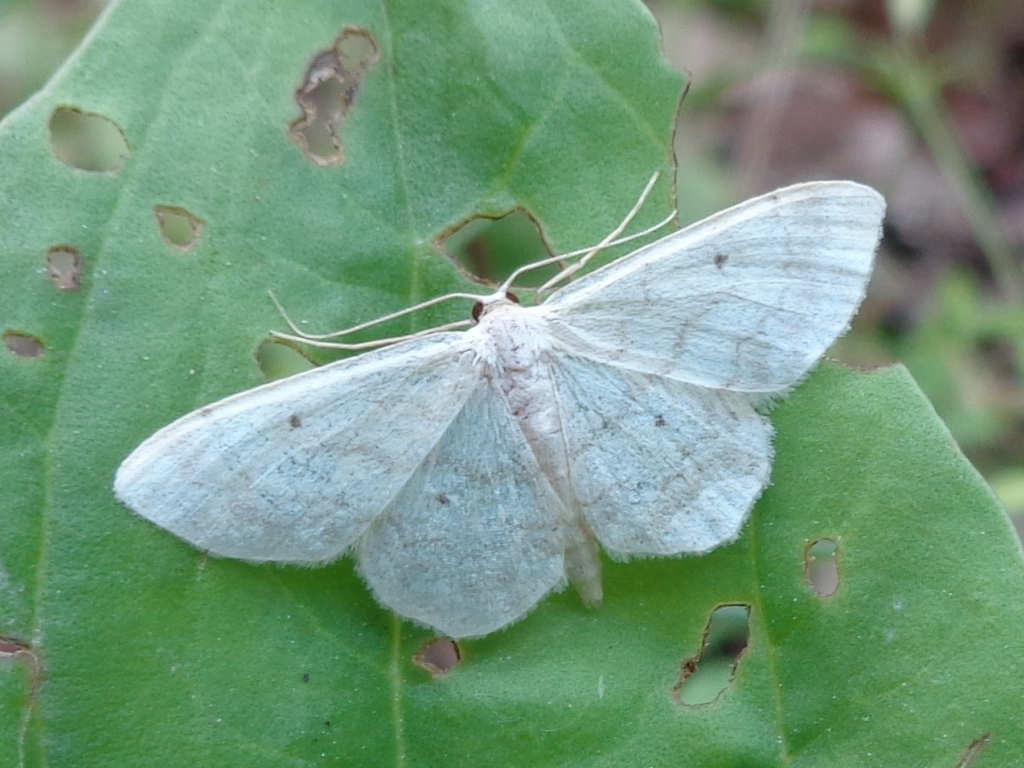

Scientific classification
- Domain: Eukaryota
- Kingdom: Animalia
- Phylum: Arthropoda
- Class: Insecta
- Order: Lepidoptera
- Family: Geometridae
- Genus: Scopula
- Species: S. caricaria

Binomial name
- Scopula caricaria (Reutti, 1853)

Synonyms
- Acidalia caricaria Reutti, 1853; Phalaena immaculataria Villers, 1789 (nomen dubium); Phalaena virginalis Fourcroy, 1785 (nomen dubium); Scopula virginalis; Acidalia phlearia Reutti, 1853

= Scopula caricaria =

Species of geometer moth in subfamily Sterrhinae

Scopula caricaria is a moth of the family Geometridae. It is found in Spain, Italy, France, Liechtenstein, Germany, Austria, Switzerland, Poland, the Czech Republic, Slovakia, Hungary, Romania, Slovenia, Croatia, Bosnia and Herzegovina, Finland, Estonia, Latvia, north-western Russia, Belarus and Ukraine.

The wingspan is 24–28 millimetres (0.94–1.10 in). Adults are on wing from July to September in one generation per year. Although there is a partial second generation in the southern part of the range.

The larvae feed on Centaurea and Artemisia species.
