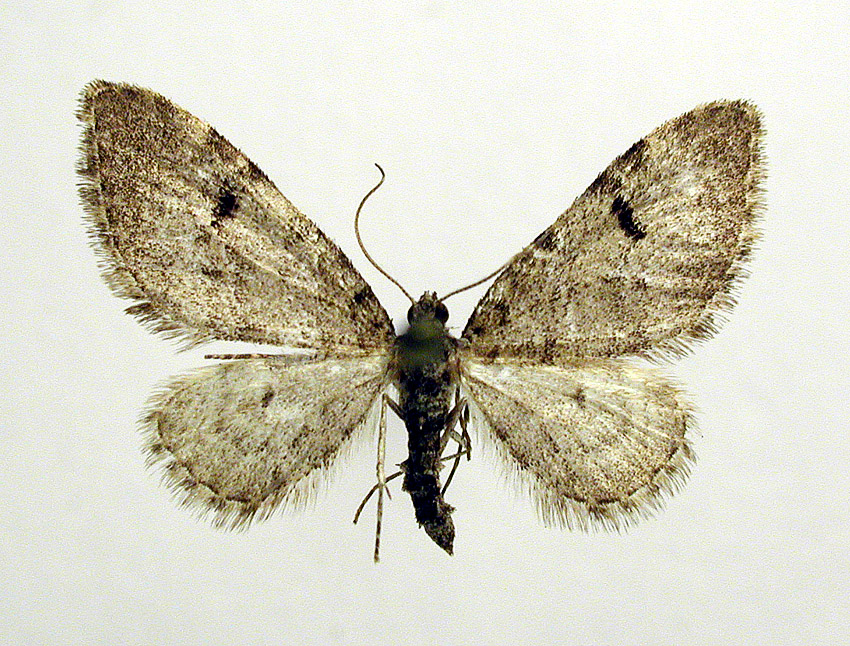

Scientific classification
- Domain: Eukaryota
- Kingdom: Animalia
- Phylum: Arthropoda
- Class: Insecta
- Order: Lepidoptera
- Family: Geometridae
- Genus: Eupithecia
- Species: E. conterminata

Binomial name
- Eupithecia conterminata (Lienig, 1846)

Synonyms
- Larentia conterminata Lienig & Zeller, 1846; Eupithecia manniaria Herrich-Schaffer, 1848

= Eupithecia conterminata =

Species of moth

Eupithecia conterminata is a moth of the family Geometridae. The species can be found from Fennoscandia and the mountains of central Europe, through the Caucasus to southern Siberia.

The wingspan is 14–17 mm. There are two generations per year with adults on wing from the mid May to June.

The larvae feed on Picea abies. Larvae can be found from the end of July to mid August. It overwinters as a pupa.

== Subspecies ==
- Eupithecia conterminata conterminata
- Eupithecia conterminata idiopusillata Inoue, 1979
