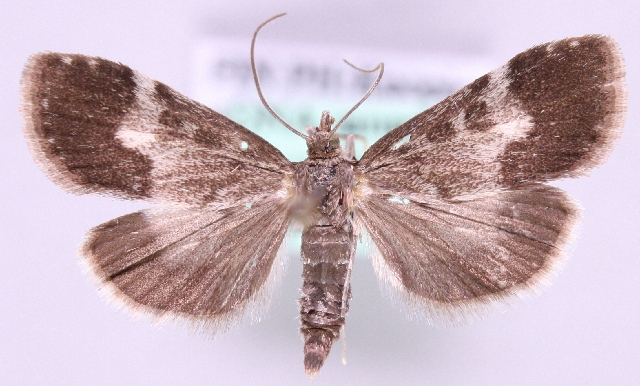

Scientific classification
- Domain: Eukaryota
- Kingdom: Animalia
- Phylum: Arthropoda
- Class: Insecta
- Order: Lepidoptera
- Family: Crambidae
- Genus: Udea
- Species: U. hamalis

Binomial name
- Udea hamalis (Thunberg, 1788)

Synonyms
- Pyralis hamalis Thunberg, 1788; Pyralis nyctemeralis Hübner, 1796; Hercyna intricalis Eversmann, 1854; Pyrausta nyctemeralis amurensis Rebel, 1907

= Udea hamalis =

Species of moth

Udea hamalis is a species of moth in the family Crambidae described by Carl Peter Thunberg in 1788. It is found from Fennoscandia south to Switzerland and Ukraine and from France east to Russia.

The wingspan is 16–21 mm.

The larvae feed on Vaccinium, Oxalis and Anemone species.
