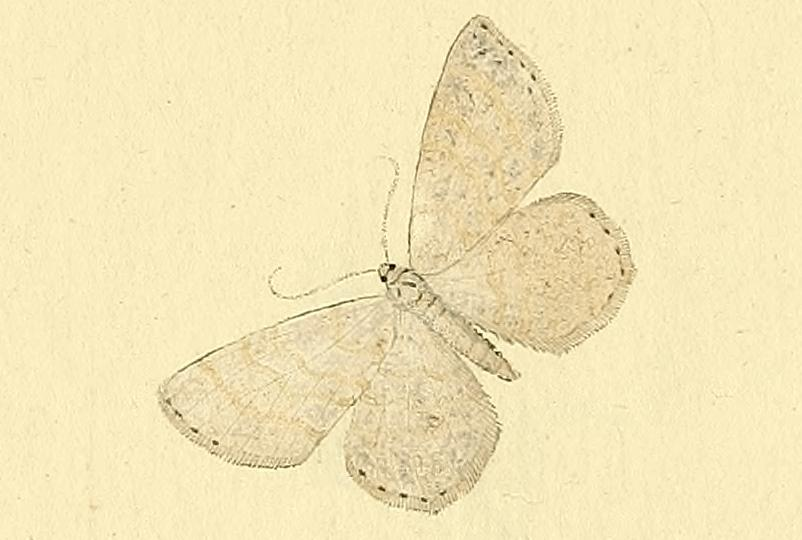

Scientific classification
- Domain: Eukaryota
- Kingdom: Animalia
- Phylum: Arthropoda
- Class: Insecta
- Order: Lepidoptera
- Family: Geometridae
- Genus: Scopula
- Species: S. nemoraria

Binomial name
- Scopula nemoraria (Hübner, [1799])

Synonyms
- Geometra nemoraria Hubner, 1799; Acidalia aliata Herrich-Schaffer, 1847

= Scopula nemoraria =

Species of geometer moth in subfamily Sterrhinae

Scopula nemoraria is a moth of the family Geometridae. It is found from central to eastern Europe, east to Russia and China.

The wingspan is 26–29 millimetres (1.0–1.1 in). Adults are on wing in June.

The larvae feed on Hypericum perforatum and Lysimachia vulgaris.
