= Scythris fuscoaenea =

Scientific classification
- Kingdom: Animalia
- Phylum: Arthropoda
- Class: Insecta
- Order: Lepidoptera
- Family: Scythrididae
- Genus: Scythris
- Species: S. fuscoaenea

Binomial name
- Scythris fuscoaenea (Haworth, 1828)

Synonyms
- Porrectaria fuscoaenea Haworth, 1828

Species of moth

Scythris fuscoaenea is a moth of the family Scythrididae found in Europe.

== Description ==
Larvae feed on common rock-rose (Helianthemum nummularium), living within a silken tube or tent, on or below the plant.
