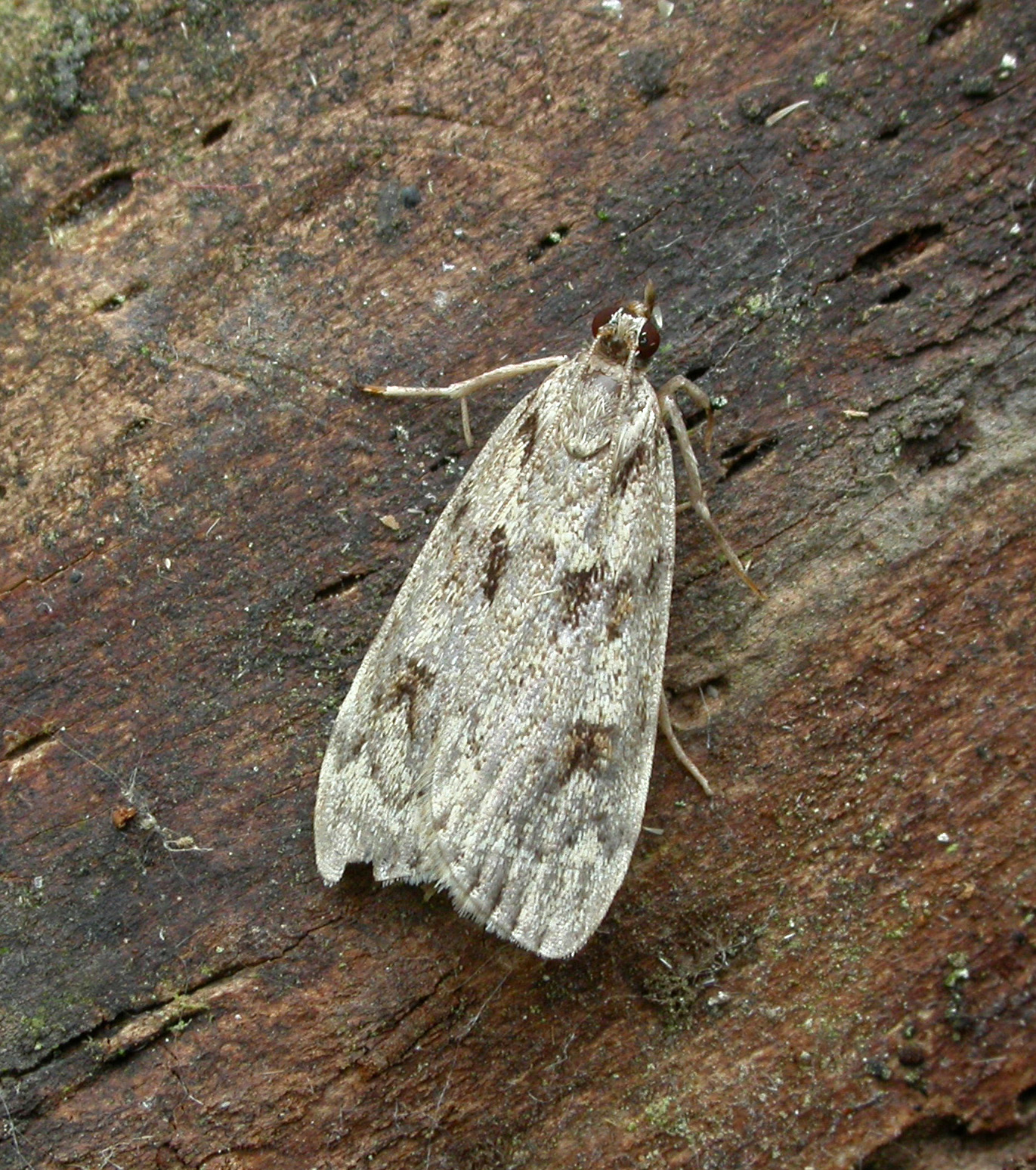

Scientific classification
- Kingdom: Animalia
- Phylum: Arthropoda
- Class: Insecta
- Order: Lepidoptera
- Family: Crambidae
- Genus: Scoparia
- Species: S. ancipitella

Binomial name
- Scoparia ancipitella (La Harpe, 1855)

Synonyms
- Eudorea ancipitella La Harpe, 1855; Eudorea conspicualis Hodgkinson, 1881; Scoparia ulmella Knaggs, 1867

= Scoparia ancipitella =

Species of moth

Scoparia ancipitella is a species of moth in the family Crambidae. It is found in most of Europe (except the Iberian Peninsula, the Benelux, Ukraine and most of the Balkan Peninsula). It has also been recorded from China (Gansu, Hebei, Heilongjiang, Henan, Jilin, Ningxia, Shaanxi, Sichuan, Xinjiang).

The wingspan is 18–21 mm. Adults are on wing in July and August.

The larvae probably feed on mosses and lichens.
