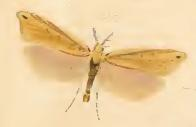

Scientific classification
- Domain: Eukaryota
- Kingdom: Animalia
- Phylum: Arthropoda
- Class: Insecta
- Order: Lepidoptera
- Family: Gelechiidae
- Genus: Dichomeris
- Species: D. limosellus

Binomial name
- Dichomeris limosellus (Schläger, 1849)

Synonyms
- Hypsolophus limosellus Schlager, 1849; Dichomeris limosella; Coleophora lutifrontella Bruand, 1850; Hypsolophus deflectivellus Reutti, 1853

= Dichomeris limosellus =

Species of moth

Dichomeris limosellus is a moth of the family Gelechiidae. It is found in most of Europe, except Ireland, Great Britain, Norway, the Iberian Peninsula and part of the Balkan Peninsula.

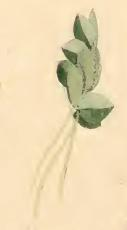
Clover leaves united by larva

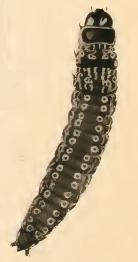
Larva

The wingspan is 19–22 mm. Adults are on wing from May to late June and again from July to September in two generations per year.

The larvae feed on Lotus, Medicago sativa and Trifolium.
