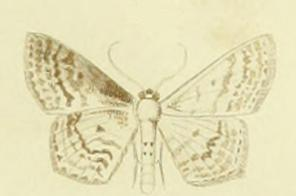

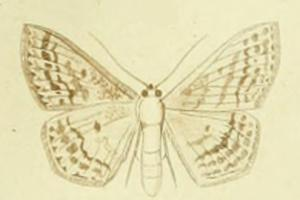

Scientific classification
- Domain: Eukaryota
- Kingdom: Animalia
- Phylum: Arthropoda
- Class: Insecta
- Order: Lepidoptera
- Family: Geometridae
- Genus: Scopula
- Species: S. corrivalaria

Binomial name
- Scopula corrivalaria (Kretschmar, 1862)

Synonyms
- Acidalia corrivalaria Kretschmar, 1862; Scopula corrivalaria f. limburgensis Prout, 1935

= Scopula corrivalaria =

Species of geometer moth in subfamily Sterrhinae

Scopula corrivalaria is a moth of the family Geometridae. It is found from Japan, Korea, China and the Russian Far East through Siberia and Russia to western Europe. In Europe, it ranges from northern Central Europe to the Mediterranean. The habitat consists of marshes and wet meadows.

The wingspan is 20–22 millimetres (0.79–0.87 in). Adults are cream to bone yellow. They are on wing from late June to mid July.

The larvae feed on Rumex hydrolapathum. Larvae can be found from August to May. The species overwinters in the larval stage.

== Subspecies ==
- Scopula corrivalaria corrivalaria
- Scopula corrivalaria eccletica Prout, 1935
