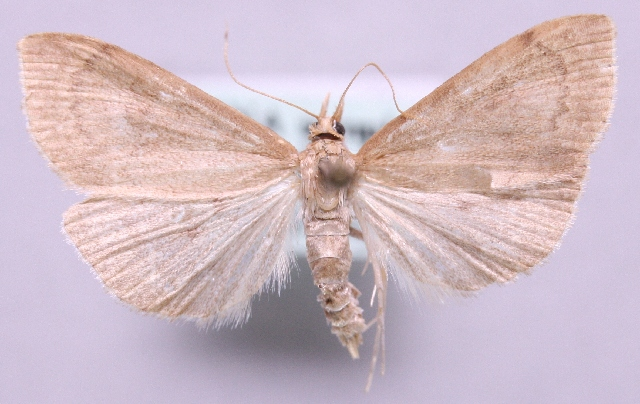

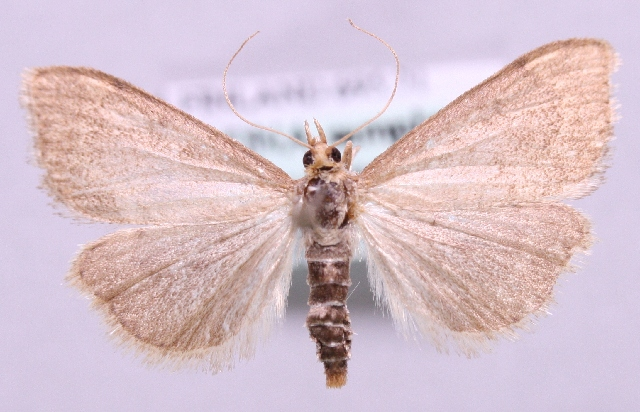

Scientific classification
- Kingdom: Animalia
- Phylum: Arthropoda
- Clade: Pancrustacea
- Class: Insecta
- Order: Lepidoptera
- Family: Crambidae
- Genus: Udea
- Species: U. accolalis

Binomial name
- Udea accolalis (Zeller, 1867)

Synonyms
- Botys accolalis Zeller, 1867

= Udea accolalis =

Species of moth

Udea accolalis is a species of moth in the family Crambidae described by Philipp Christoph Zeller in 1867. It is found in France, Switzerland, Italy, Austria, the Czech Republic, Slovakia, Hungary, Poland, Romania, Ukraine, Belarus, the Baltic region, Finland, Sweden and Russia.

The wingspan is 18–19 mm.

The larvae feed on Senecio vulgaris, Picris and Pulicaria dysenterica.
