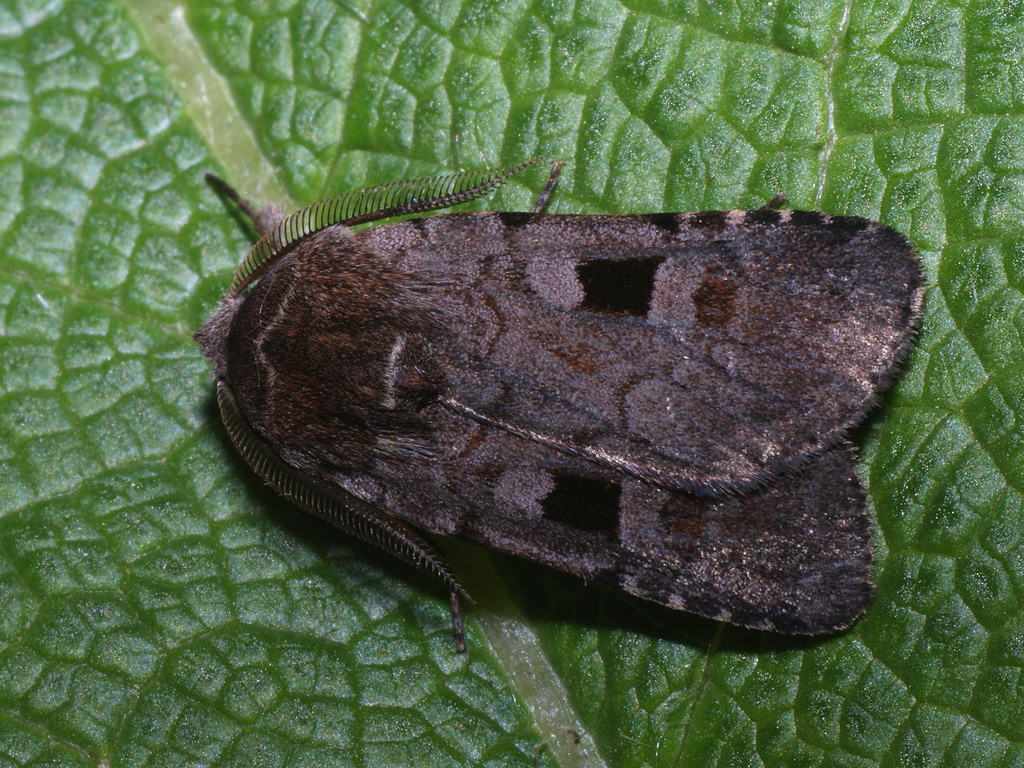

Scientific classification
- Domain: Eukaryota
- Kingdom: Animalia
- Phylum: Arthropoda
- Class: Insecta
- Order: Lepidoptera
- Superfamily: Noctuoidea
- Family: Noctuidae
- Subfamily: Noctuinae
- Genus: Netrocerocora; Bartel, 1902
- Species: N. quadrangula

Binomial name
- Netrocerocora quadrangula Eversmann, 1844

= Netrocerocora =

Genus of moths

Netrocerocora is a monotypic moth genus of the family Noctuidae erected by Max Bartel in 1902. Its only species, Netrocerocora quadrangula, was first described by Eduard Friedrich Eversmann in 1844 as Noctua quadrangula.
