= Bucculatrix artemisiella =

Scientific classification
- Kingdom: Animalia
- Phylum: Arthropoda
- Clade: Pancrustacea
- Class: Insecta
- Order: Lepidoptera
- Family: Bucculatricidae
- Genus: Bucculatrix
- Species: B. artemisiella

Binomial name
- Bucculatrix artemisiella Herrich-Schäffer, 1855

Species of moth

Bucculatrix artemisiella is a species of moth of the family Bucculatricidae. It is found in most of Europe (except Ireland, the Mediterranean islands and the Balkan Peninsula). It was first described by Gottlieb August Wilhelm Herrich-Schäffer in 1855.

The wingspan is 7–8 mm.

The larvae feed on Artemisia campestris. They mine the leaves of their host plant.
