= Scythris pudorinella =

Scientific classification
- Kingdom: Animalia
- Phylum: Arthropoda
- Class: Insecta
- Order: Lepidoptera
- Family: Scythrididae
- Genus: Scythris
- Species: S. pudorinella

Binomial name
- Scythris pudorinella (Möschler, 1866)

Synonyms
- Butalis pudorinella Möschler, 1866

Species of moth

Scythris pudorinella is a moth of the family Scythrididae. It was described by Heinrich Benno Möschler in 1866. It is found in Greece, Romania, Russia (southern Ural, Lower Volga region, Altai Mountains), Turkey and Uzbekistan.
