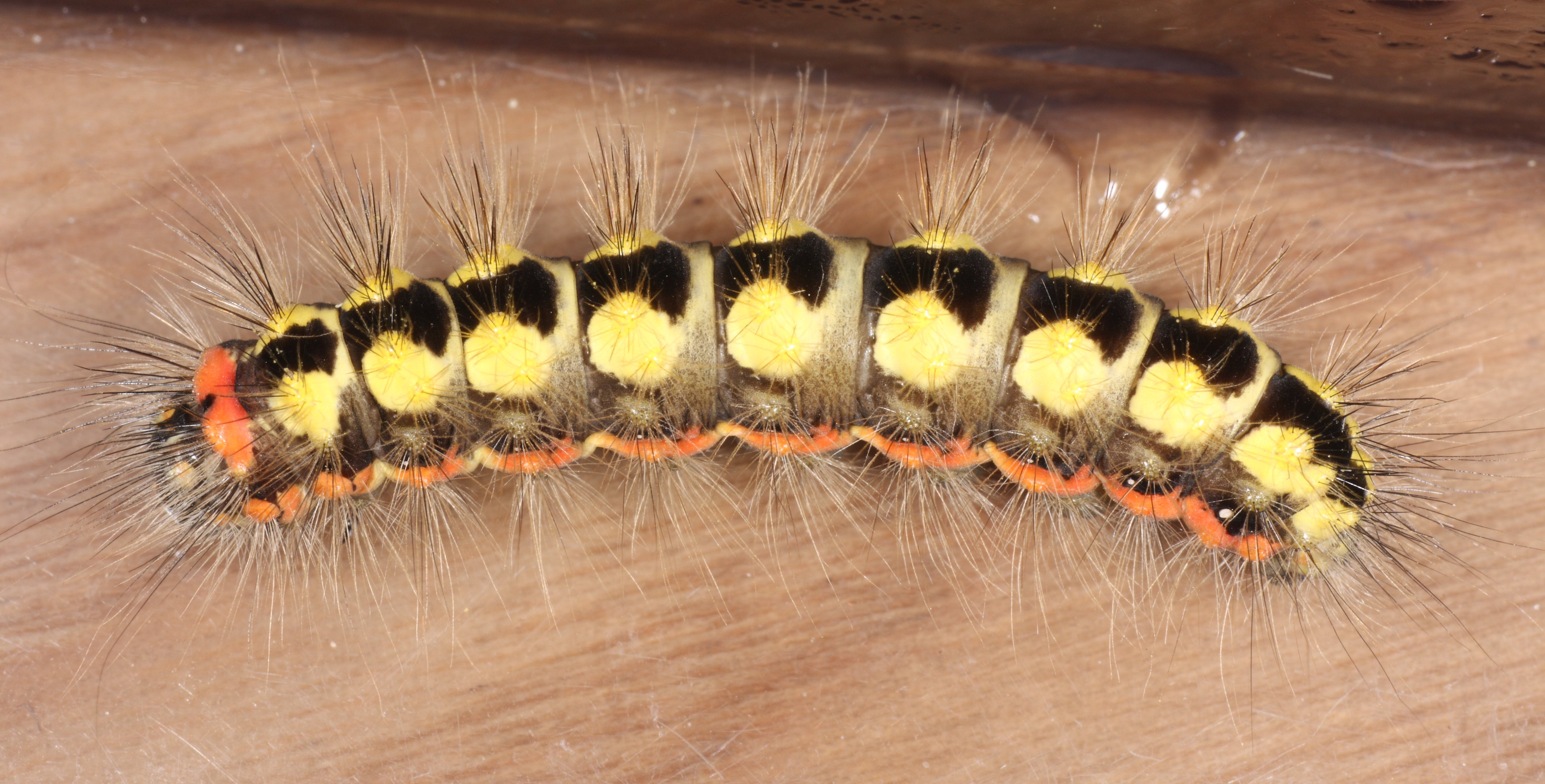

Scientific classification
- Kingdom: Animalia
- Phylum: Arthropoda
- Clade: Pancrustacea
- Class: Insecta
- Order: Lepidoptera
- Superfamily: Noctuoidea
- Family: Noctuidae
- Genus: Acronicta
- Species: A. cinerea

Binomial name
- Acronicta cinerea Hufnagel, 1766

Synonyms
- Phalaena cinerea Hufnagel, 1766; Acronicta abscondita Treitschke, 1835

= Acronicta cinerea =

Species of moth

Acronicta cinerea is a moth of the family Noctuidae. It is found from northern Germany, Poland, Slovakia, the Czech Republic, the Baltic, Norway, southern Finland, Belarus, Ukraine, western Russia up to Uralsk and Guberli.

Some authors consider Acronicta cinerea a synonym of Acronicta euphorbiae
