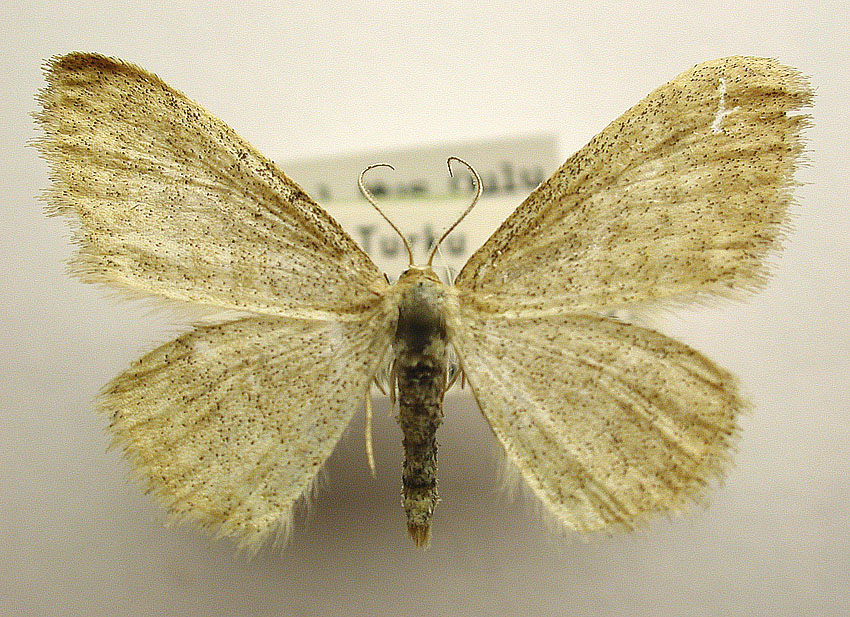

Scientific classification
- Kingdom: Animalia
- Phylum: Arthropoda
- Clade: Pancrustacea
- Class: Insecta
- Order: Lepidoptera
- Family: Geometridae
- Genus: Idaea
- Species: I. pallidata

Binomial name
- Idaea pallidata (Denis & Schiffermüller, 1775)

= Idaea pallidata =

Species of moth

Idaea pallidata is a moth of the family Geometridae. It is found from northern and central Europe to the Caucasus, central Asia and the Amur Region.

The wingspan is 18–20 mm for males and 16–19 mm for females. The adults fly in one generation from mid May to late June.. They are attracted to light.

The larvae feed on withered or dry leaves of various herbaceous plants such as Achillea millefolium, Valeriana officinalis, Filipendula ulmaria and Vaccinium myrtillus.

== Notes ==
1. The flight season refers to Belgium. This may vary in other parts of the range.
