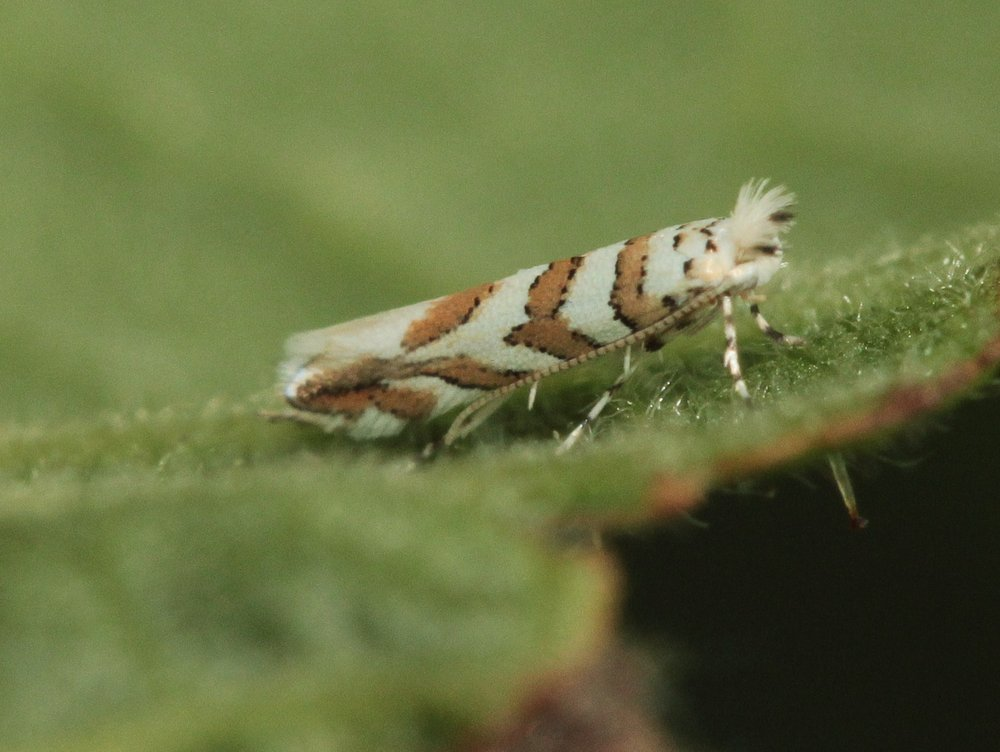

Scientific classification
- Kingdom: Animalia
- Phylum: Arthropoda
- Clade: Pancrustacea
- Class: Insecta
- Order: Lepidoptera
- Family: Gracillariidae
- Genus: Phyllonorycter
- Species: P. kuhlweiniella

Binomial name
- Phyllonorycter kuhlweiniella (Zeller, 1839)

Synonyms
- Lithocolletis kuhlweiniella Zeller, 1839; Tinea hortella Fabricius, 1794 (Primary homonym of Tinea hortella Fabricius); Elachista saportella Duponchel, 1840

= Phyllonorycter kuhlweiniella =

Species of moth

Phyllonorycter kuhlweiniella is a moth of the family Gracillariidae. It is found from Germany to the Iberian Peninsula, Italy and Albania and from Great Britain to central and southern Russia.

The wingspan is 8–9 millimetres (0.31–0.35 in). There are two generations per year with adults on wing in May and again from late July to August.

The larvae feed on Quercus petraea, Quercus pubescens and Quercus robur. They mine the leaves of their host plant.
