= Scythris fuscopterella =

Scientific classification
- Kingdom: Animalia
- Phylum: Arthropoda
- Clade: Pancrustacea
- Class: Insecta
- Order: Lepidoptera
- Family: Scythrididae
- Genus: Scythris
- Species: S. fuscopterella

Binomial name
- Scythris fuscopterella Bengtsson, 1997

Species of moth

Scythris fuscopterella is a moth of the family Scythrididae. It was described by Bengt Å. Bengtsson in 1997. It is found in Belarus, Moldova, Ukraine, eastern Siberia, France, Finland and Sweden.

The wingspan is 13–14 mm.

The larvae possibly feed on Ericaceae species.
