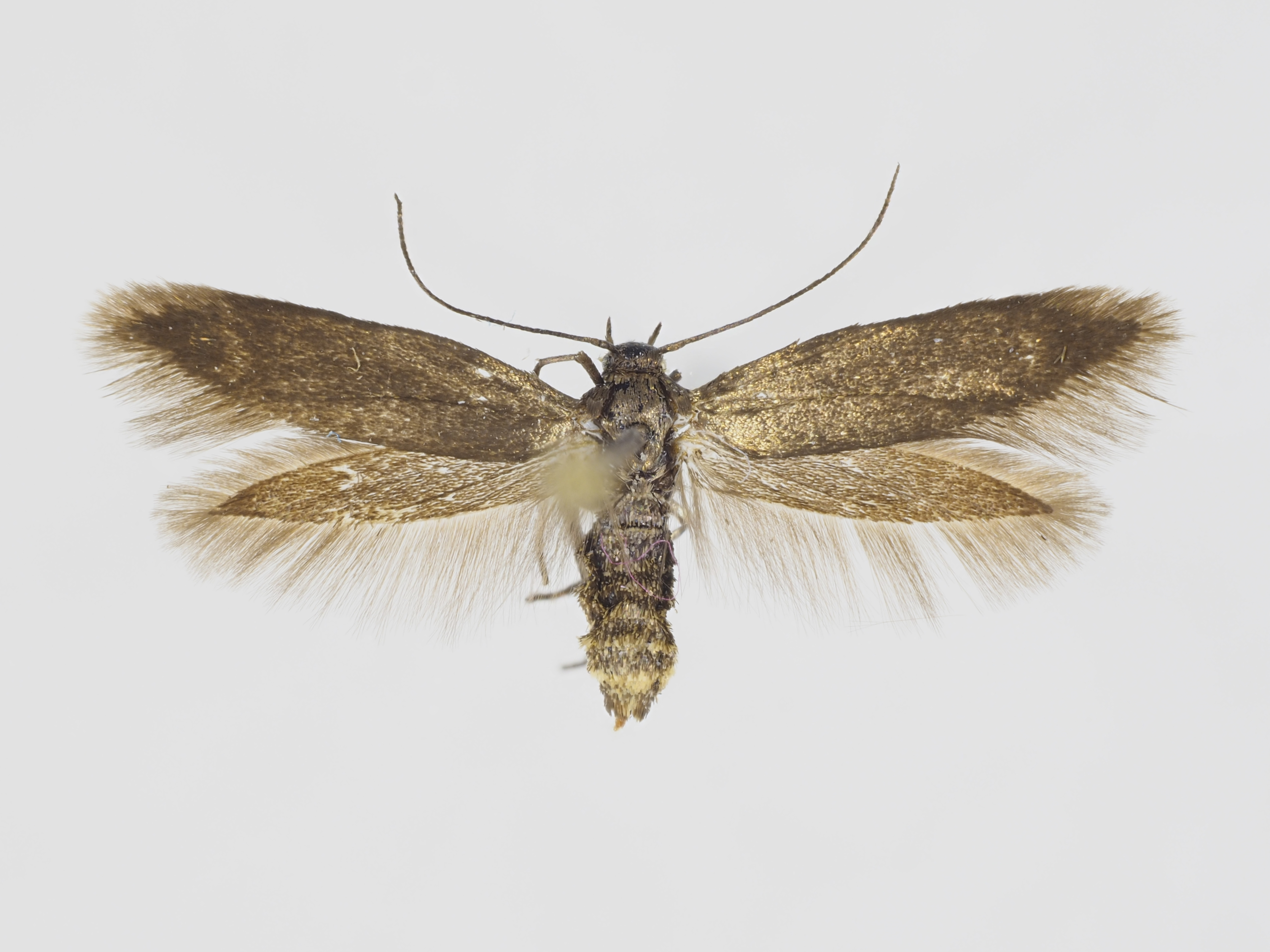

Scientific classification
- Kingdom: Animalia
- Phylum: Arthropoda
- Clade: Pancrustacea
- Class: Insecta
- Order: Lepidoptera
- Family: Scythrididae
- Genus: Scythris
- Species: S. productella

Binomial name
- Scythris productella Zeller, 1839

= Scythris productella =

Species of moth

Scythris productella is a species of moth belonging to the family Scythrididae.

It is native to Europe.
