= Scythris palustris =

Scientific classification
- Kingdom: Animalia
- Phylum: Arthropoda
- Clade: Pancrustacea
- Class: Insecta
- Order: Lepidoptera
- Family: Scythrididae
- Genus: Scythris
- Species: S. palustris

Binomial name
- Scythris palustris (Zeller, 1855)

Species of moth

Scythris palustris is a moth belonging to the family Scythrididae. The species was first described by Philipp Christoph Zeller in 1855.

It is native to Europe.
