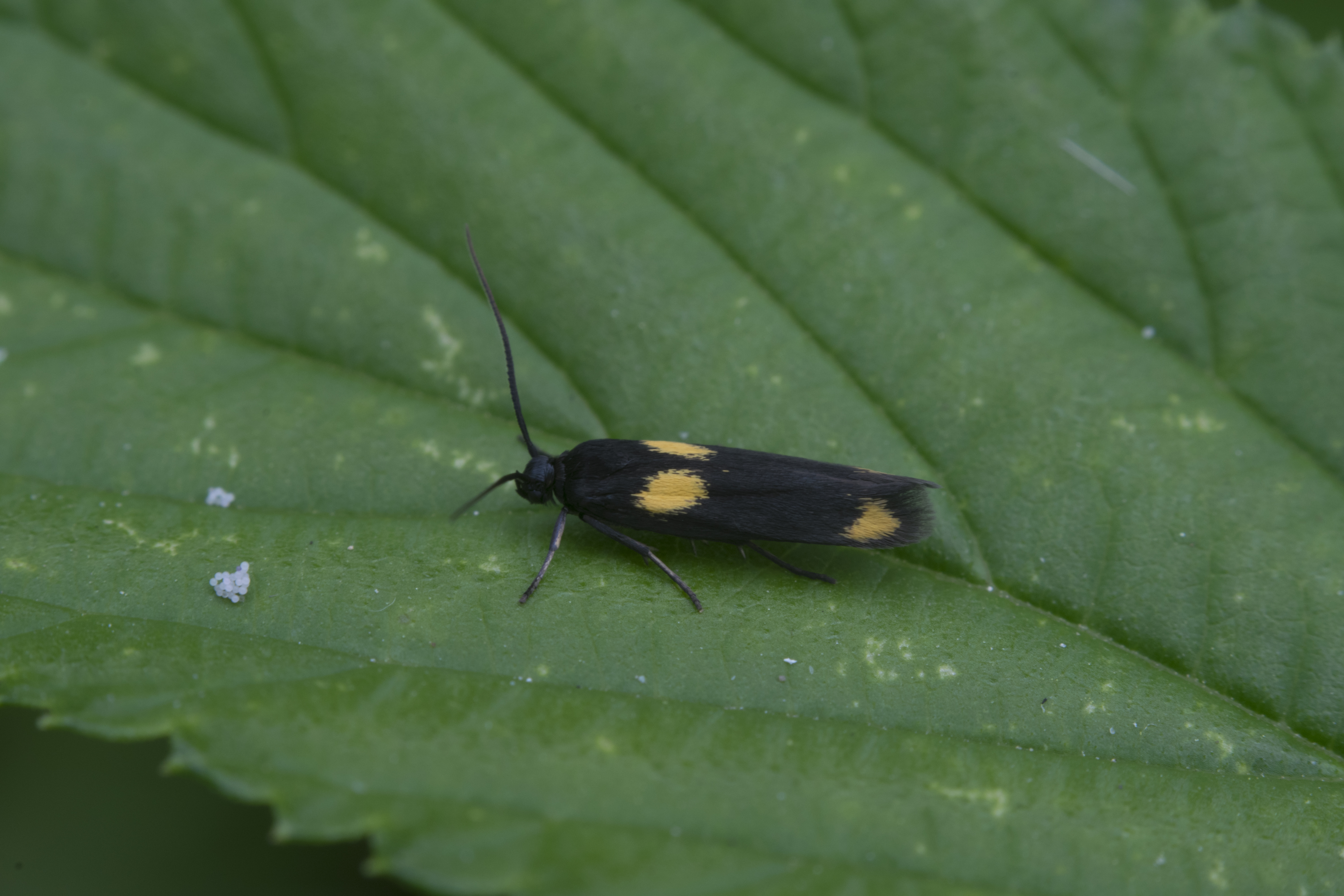
- Scythris sinensis in Bucharest, Romania

Scientific classification
- Kingdom: Animalia
- Phylum: Arthropoda
- Class: Insecta
- Order: Lepidoptera
- Family: Scythrididae
- Genus: Scythris
- Species: S. sinensis

Binomial name
- Scythris sinensis (Felder & Rogenhofer, 1875)

Synonyms
- List: Butalis sinensis Felder & Rogenhofer, 1875; Staintonia apiciguttella Christoph, 1882; Scythris pyrrhopyga Filipjev, 1924; Eretmocera pentaxantha Meyrick, 1929; Scythris kibarae Matsumura, 1931; Scythris mitakeana Matsumura, 1931

= Scythris sinensis =

Species of moth

Scythris sinensis is a moth of the family Scythrididae first described by the Austrian entomologists Baron Cajetan von Felder and Alois Friedrich Rogenhofer in 1875. The moth is found in Asia, Europe and North America.

== Description ==
The wingspan is 10–14 mm. The forewings are blue-blackish and the hindwings are dark fuscous. The larvae feed on goosefoot (Chenopodium album) and common orache (Atriplex patula).

== Distribution ==
The moth is known from the Far East and has been found in eastern Europe in recent years, probably as accidental introductions. It is also found in central Russia, southern Siberia and Pennsylvania in North America. In Great Britain the moth is only known from two specimens discovered in a shop in Kent in 1980. They were probably accidentally imported.
