= Cabera nathaliae =

Scientific classification
- Domain: Eukaryota
- Kingdom: Animalia
- Phylum: Arthropoda
- Class: Insecta
- Order: Lepidoptera
- Family: Geometridae
- Genus: Cabera
- Species group: Cabera subalba group
- Species: C. nathaliae

Binomial name
- Cabera nathaliae Herbulot, 1991

Species of moth

Cabera nathaliae is a species of geometrid moth, endemic to Sundi on Principe Island. It is housed in the Zoologische Staatssammlung München. It belongs to the monophyletic Cabera Subalba Group.

== Description ==
Cabera nathaliae is a medium-sized Cabera species. The length of forewing is 12–15 mm (0.47-0.59 in), and is broad and pointed. The hindwing resembles the forewing, but has a shorter point at anal angle.

It shares morphological similarities with Cabera limbata from continental Africa, and Cabera toulgoeti from Madagascar. It differs on the basis of well-developed and convex basal and medial lines on both the forewings and hindwings. Additionally, there is absence of prominent white discal spots as compared to C. subalba, both of which occur in the same region. It also shows mottled appearance, as a result of partial albinism, a condition shared with C. humbloti and C. nevillei.

== Appearance ==
The forewings and hindwings both display well-developed lines. In contrast, the postmedial line is only faintly visible on the forewings and is entirely absent on the hindwings. The discal spots on forewings are black, enclosed in a white ring, which stands out against the base color. The ones on the hindwing are similar (blackish) but fainter and less prominent.

The ventral surface of the wings is predominantly whitish. There is a bolder terminal shade on the forewings, as compared to its dorsal side. A black postmedial line is present on underside, resembling the one on the upperside. However it is more discontinuous, and widens into interneural spaces. This creates a fragmented pattern which is different from its congeners.

=== Female genitalia ===
The female genitalia comprises a tubular bursa copulatrix. The upper third of its wall has an instrate condition, which means it is covered in minute denticles. This structure extends beyond its antrum, and gradually gets slender and eventually to a fine point at the junction connecting the ductus seminalis. Unlike other Cabera species, these butterflies lack a signum.

== Distribution and habitat ==
These butterflies are exclusively recorded in Sao Tome and Principe in Central Africa, particularly in the locality of Sundi.
