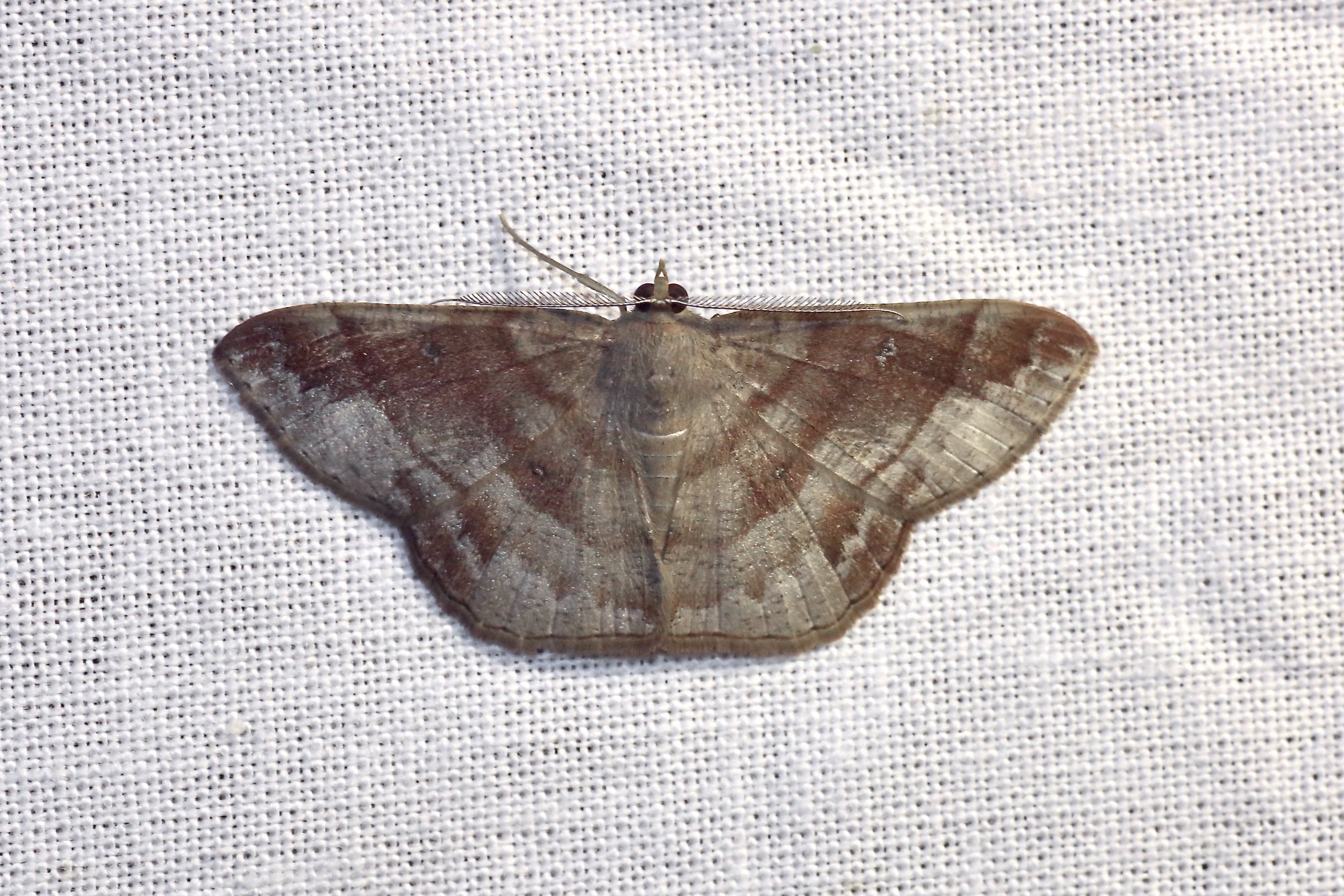
- Male in Zimbabwe highlands.

Scientific classification
- Kingdom: Animalia
- Phylum: Arthropoda
- Clade: Pancrustacea
- Class: Insecta
- Order: Lepidoptera
- Family: Geometridae
- Genus: Cabera
- Species group: Cabera subalba group
- Species: C. nevillei

Binomial name
- Cabera nevillei Kruger, 2000

= Cabera nevillei =

Species of moth

Cabera nevillei is a species of geometrid moth endemic to Zimbabwe. It belongs to the monophylectic Cabera subalba Group.

== Etymology ==
The species is named after Neville J. Duke.

== Description ==
Cabera nevillei is a medium-sized Cabera species. The forewing is which is broad and pointed, with length ranging from 15–16 mm in males, and 16–17 mm in females. . The hindwing resembles the forewing, except it has a shorter point at the anal angle. Adults are on wing in February, April, May, October and December.

It is morphologically similar to its sister species Cabera toulgoeti and Cabera limbata . From the former, it can be differentiated on the basis of having less prominent discal spots on the upperside of forewings. Furthermore, the underside bears striking resemblance of each, however, the terminal shade appears more developed in C. nevillei when observed closely. The genitals also differ in size and structure. The socci are shorter with a more curved aedeagus as compared to C. toulgoeti.

From C. limbata, it is distinguished on its genitals. There are five conuti on the aedeagus, instead of a single one in the latter species. Occasionally, C. nevillei has more prominent and well-defined markings. Notably, one of the male paratypes exhibits partial albinism, where much of the violaceous-grey coloration in the postmedian areas of both pairs of wings is replaced by a whitish-grey hue.

== Appearance ==
Adult specimens exhibit sexual dimorphism. It is mostly observed through their antennae, as the ones in males are bipectinate (comb-like), while the ones in females are filiform (thread-like). The wings are wide and large, with the forewings featuring a straight costa, pointed tip, and the outermost wing edge, or termen, being slightly curved outwards. The wings primarily have a greyish-white coloration, suffused with brown. They have violaceous tinges and fine grey striations.

The forewings are marked with slightly curved basal and medial lines, as well as an oblique postmedial line, all of which are brown. The hindwings also have these lines; however, they are less distinct compared to the forewings. On the forewing, the discal spots are small and black, frequently encircled in a white outline (sometimes entirely white). On the hindwing, they resemble the ones on their respective forewing pair, only differing in size as they are much smaller and with more amount of white. The underside of the wings is greyish white with grey striations. This shade gradually grows darker by the terminal end, having black discal spots that are more prominent than on the forewings. The body's vestiture matches the wing coloration, and the abdominal segment A3 lacks a setal comb.

== Distribution ==
Cabera nevillei is found across the eastern highlands of Zimbabwe in montane and forest habitats. Localities recorded with occurrence include Vumba, Mount Selinda, Aberfoyle, and Rusitu Forest. Its range extends into Mozambique, where it has been documented in Serra Rolanda (East of Chimanimani Mountains), and Mussapa River Forest.
