= Cabera subalba group =

Scientific classification
- Kingdom: Animalia
- Phylum: Arthropoda
- Class: Insecta
- Order: Lepidoptera
- Family: Geometridae
- Genus: Cabera
- Species group: Cabera subalba group Krüger, 2000

Group of moths

The Cabera subalba group is a monophyletic group under the genus Cabera. These moths are widely distributed in the Palaearctic, Nearctic, Neotropic and Afrotropic regions, and a few in Indo-Australian regions. However, the group is absent in Australia itself.

== Description ==
The butterflies in this group are medium sized Cabera species. The length of the forewing is 12–15 mm (0.47–0.59 in), and is broad and pointed. The hindwing resembles the forewing, but with a shorter point at anal angle.

The upperside of wings is violaceous-grey or brownish-grey, featuring fine darker grey striations. Occasionally, some areas of the wings are paler. The underside of the wings is significantly lighter than the upperside and has a violet tinge on a light grey base, finely striated with dark grey. A narrow to broad terminal shade is present along the edges, which is darker than the base violet-grey color. The forewing pattern consists of simple line arrangements. The basal and postmedian lines are relatively straight, while the median line is undulating and runs just before the discal spot. This spot varies, as it can be either black or white. The hindwing follows a similar pattern, but it differs on the basis of: absence of basal line; minute discal spots; spots encircled in either white or black.The cilia and the body vestiture are consistent in color with the wings.

=== Male genitalia ===
The male genitalia include a moderately long, setose uncus, having a knob-like apex at its end. There are very well-developed socii, arising from the dorsal region of the base of the uncus, while the gnathos is reduced. Its genital capsule is wide, elliptical and well-developed.

The aedaegus is medium-sized and ranges from cylindrical to slightly spindle-shaped, having the vesica bearing one to five nail-like cornuti, at times accompanied by microcornuti. The pregenital abdomen shows no modifications in segment A8, which means no octavals are formed.

=== Female genitalia ===
The female genitalia is elongated with its corpus busae extending throughout most of the abdomen. Its papillae anales are sparsely setose, and the apophyses are long and thin, with exterior apophyses twice in length as the anterior ones. The bursa copulatrix is long, tubular, and weakly sclerotized (except posteriormost portion) with an imperceptible transition between ductus and corpus bursae. However, in C. nevillei, a broad sclerotized belt is found. The signum is absent.

== Habitat and distribution ==
The species of the group are distributed across western Africa (Sao Tome and Principe, Guinea, Ghana, Ivory Coast, Cameroon), southern Africa (Zimbabwe, Mozambique), and the Malagasy subregion (Madagascar, Comoro Islands).

== Species ==
This group contains six species from the Cabera genus, notable on the basis of their uniform appearance:

- Cabera subalba (Warren, 1901)
- Cabera limbata (Herbulot, 1954)
- Cabera toulgoeti Herbulot, 1956
- Cabera humbloti Herbulot, 1978
- Cabera nevillei Krüger, 2000
- Cabera nathaliae Herbulot, 1991
