= Cabera subalba =

Scientific classification
- Kingdom: Animalia
- Phylum: Arthropoda
- Class: Insecta
- Order: Lepidoptera
- Family: Geometridae
- Genus: Cabera
- Species group: Cabera subalba group
- Species: C. subalba

Binomial name
- Cabera subalba (Warren, 1901)

Synonyms
- Thysanopyga subalba Warren, 1901

Species of moth

Cabera subalba is a species of geometrid moth, found on the islands of São Tomé and Príncipe in West Africa. It belongs to the monophylectic Cabera subalba Group.

== Taxonomy ==
This moth was originally described as Thysanopyga subalba.

== Description ==
Cabera subalba is a medium-sized Cabera species. The length of the forewing is 12–15 mm (0.47–0.59 in), and it is broad and pointed. The hindwing resembles the forewing, except it has a shorter point at the anal angle.

It differs from the other species in its group due to its darker overall ground coloration. Although the prominence of the white discal spot on the forewings varies among individuals, it is occasionally considered a key feature for identification. Cabera limbata is the only other moth in the group that has a single cornutus (spine-like structure) in the vesica. To differentiate between these two, variations in the valvae and socci are considered, as they are narrower and smaller in C. limbata, respectively.

== Appearance ==
Adults bear a primarily dark brown-grey ground color. The forewings contain faint, slightly convex, darker grey striations, though these are not discernible in most specimens. A prominent characteristic of the forewings is the presence of discal spots, which are bold and white in nearly all the moths, except occasionally, where they are reduced in size, and less pronounced in color. The underside is significantly lighter than the upperside.

The hindwings also contain minuscule discal spots which are white, encircled in a black outer ring. While the terminal shade on the underside is pronounced on the forewing, it is less prominent on the hindwing. The cilia and the body vestiture are consistent in color with the wings.

=== Male genitalia ===
Males contain a long and sharply pointed, setose uncus, a hook-like structure at the terminal end. The soccii lobes are also densely covered with setae. Their genital capsule is elliptical, while the 9th ventral segment, or the vinculum, contains a notable median suture, and relatively weak transtilla (band of connective tissue at the base of valvae) is present. The pair of valvae are elongated and slender, with no swelling along the centre of dorsal margin. While these claspers lack the medial group of setae, there is a group of stout setae on the apical region. There is a poorly developed sacculus and the inseminating organ, aedaegus, is short and spindle-shaped. The sheath that surrounds it, the vesica, contains a single nail-like cornutus at its apex.

=== Female genitalia ===
Adult females have a normal papillae anales. Both, the anterior and posterior apophyses have are lengthy and slender. The anterior apophyses extends nearly two-thirds the length of the posterior ones, with the protruded sterigma being substantially unmodified. The posteriormost part ductus bursae (the tube where the sperm is released) broadens into a wide antrum. Its site of copulation, the bursa copulatrix, itself is long and tube-like without a distinct boundary separating the ductus, and corpus bursae or receptacle. Unlike other related species, C. subalba differs by lacking the sclerotized structures on the inner wall of corpus bursae, referred to as the signum.
