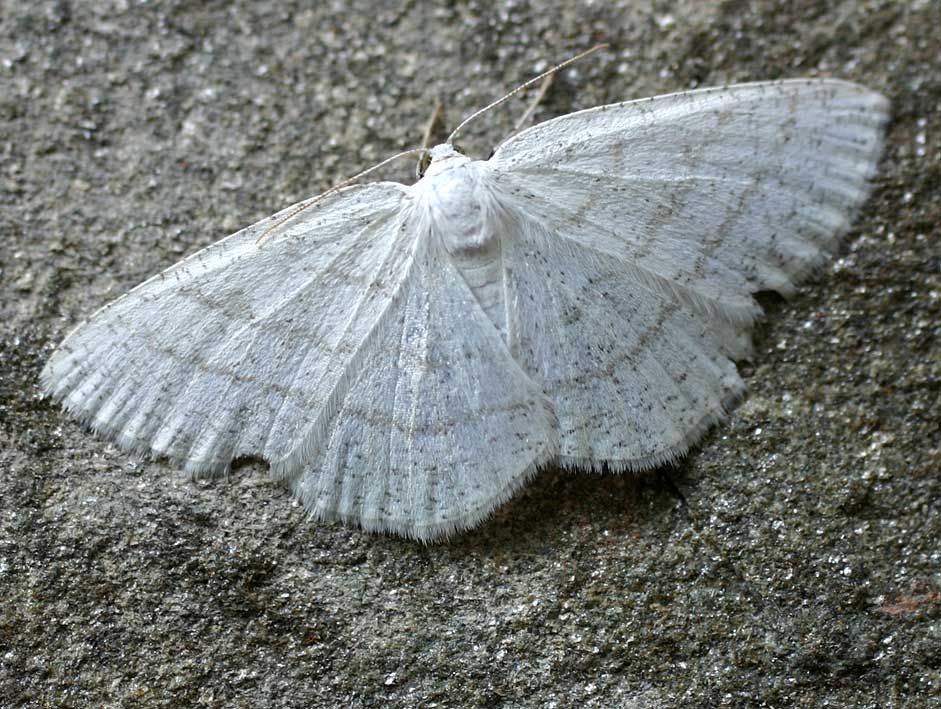

Scientific classification
- Kingdom: Animalia
- Phylum: Arthropoda
- Clade: Pancrustacea
- Class: Insecta
- Order: Lepidoptera
- Family: Geometridae
- Genus: Cabera
- Species: C. pusaria

Binomial name
- Cabera pusaria (Linnaeus, 1758)

Synonyms
- Phalaena pusaria Linnaeus, 1758

= Common white wave =

Species of moth

The common white wave (Cabera pusaria) is a moth of the family Geometridae. The species was first described by Carl Linnaeus in his 1758 10th edition of Systema Naturae. It is found throughout the Palearctic region. Their habitat is deciduous forests and their surroundings.

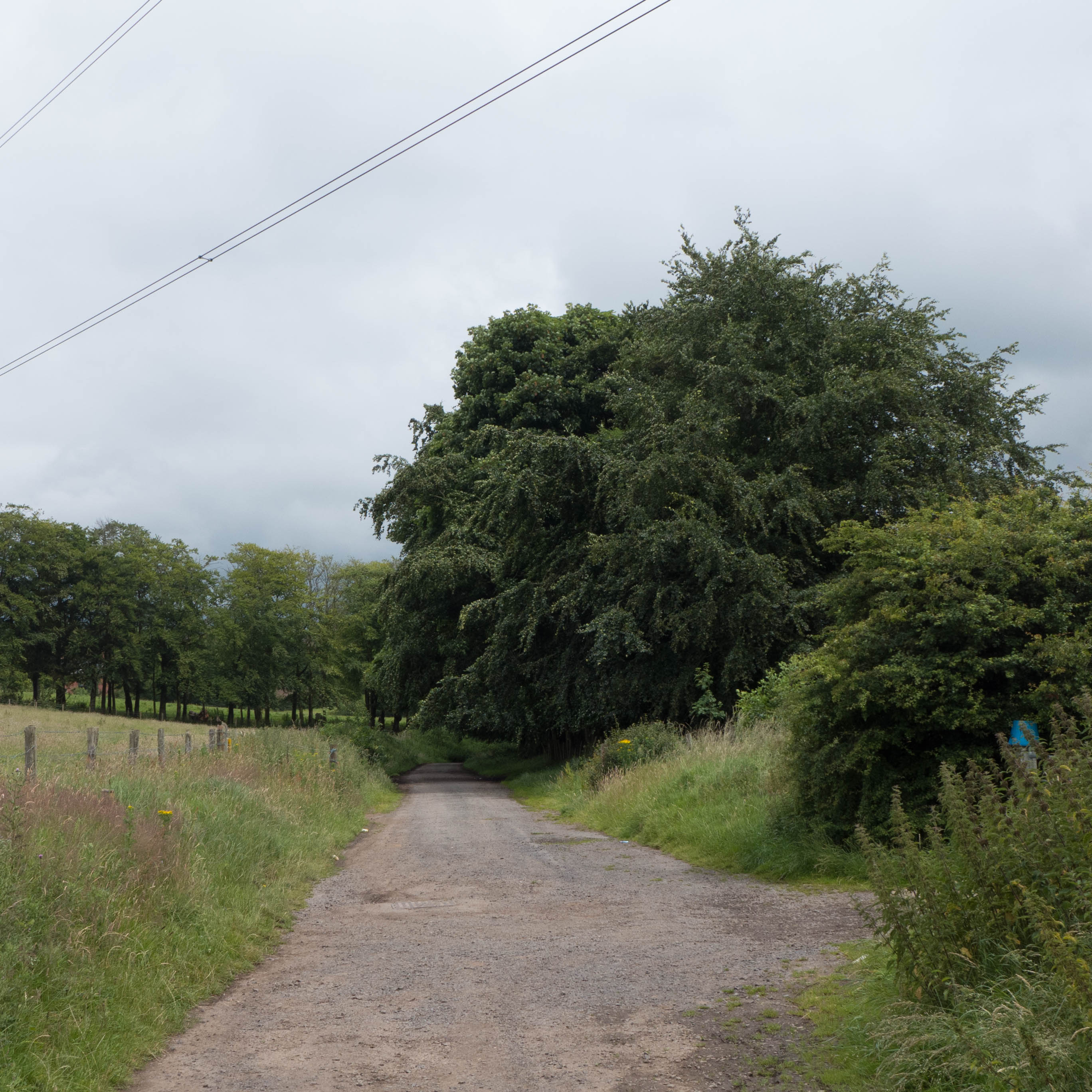
Habitat, Ireland.

== Description ==
This species has white wings, sometimes tinged with pink, slight grey dusted grey and with fine grey fascia (the first curved) on the forewing and two on the hindwing. ab. heveraria H.-Schiff. is a rare form in which the grey dusting densely covers almost the entire wings. ab. rotundaria Haw. is a rounder-winged form with the first lines strongly approximated and said to be the product of under-feeding the larvae. Hybrid fletcheri Tutt (pusaria male x exanthemata female) is just intermediate between the parent forms, rather pure white, the lines tinged with ochreous. The wingspan is 32–35 mm.

One or two broods are produced each year and the adults can be seen at any time from May to August. This moth flies at night and is attracted to light.

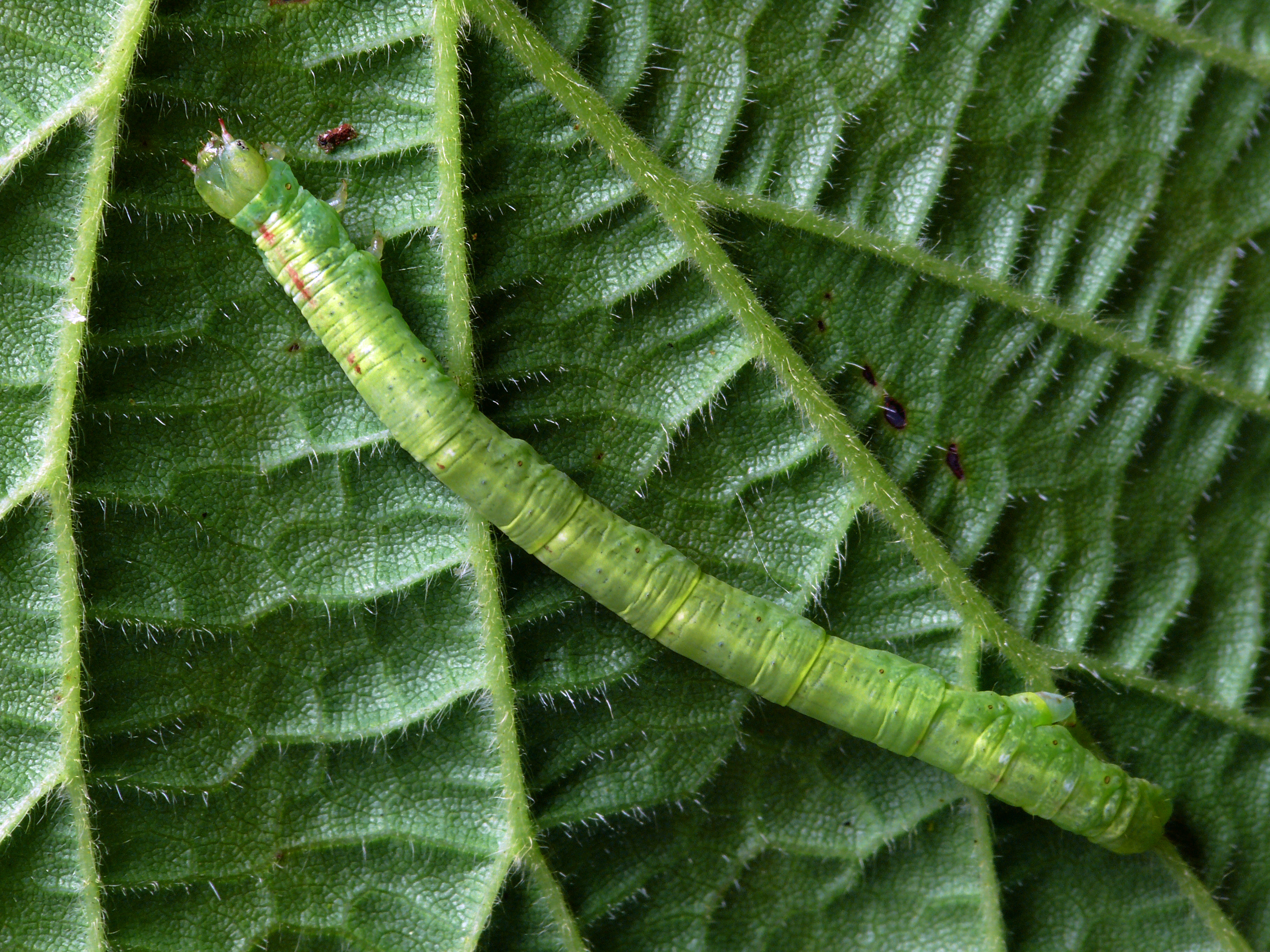
Larva.

The larva is elongate, with a rather flattened head is very variable -green with purplish brown or blackish dorsal spots sometimes vague, purplish-brown with white spots, or grey mixed with reddish, or sometimes yellowish. It feeds on various trees and shrubs including alder, aspen, birch, oak, rowan and willow. The species overwinters as a pupa. The pupa is compact, brown, the wings olive-green.

=== Similar species ===
- Common wave – Cabera exanthemata (Scopoli, 1763)
- Cabera leptographa (Wehrli, 1936)

== Taxonomy ==
Carl Linnaeus, when describing the moth, placed it in the genus Phalaena. It is now an obsolete genus, which he used to house most of the moths. The moth is now placed in the genus Cabera, which was raised by the German lepidopterist, Georg Friedrich Treitschke in 1825. Cabera refers to Cabeiro, the daughter of Proteus ″the prophetic old man of the sea who kept changing his shape to avoid being caught and having to make prophesies″. The specific name pusaria, is from pusa, the delicate complexion of a girl.
