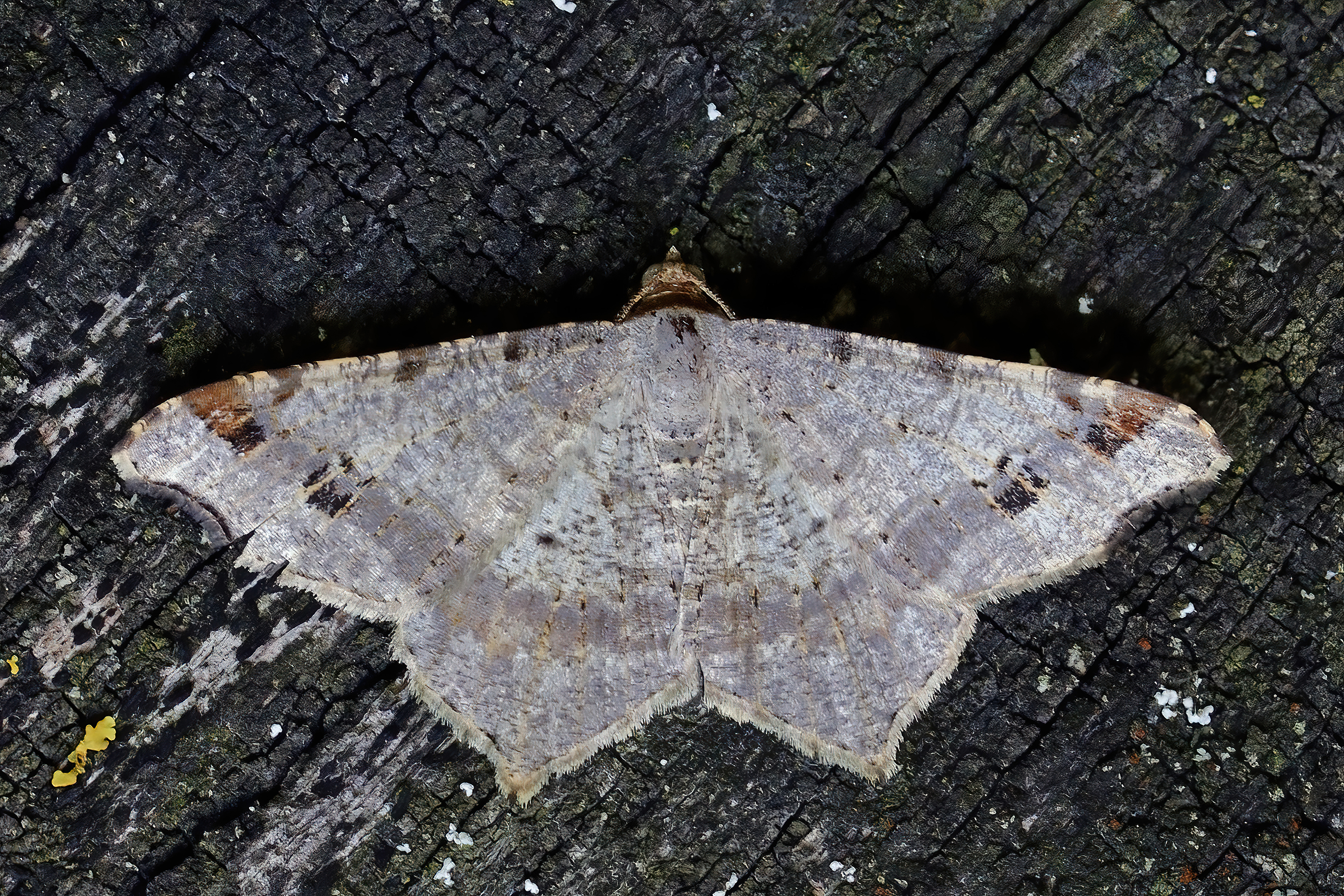

Scientific classification
- Kingdom: Animalia
- Phylum: Arthropoda
- Clade: Pancrustacea
- Class: Insecta
- Order: Lepidoptera
- Family: Geometridae
- Genus: Macaria
- Species: M. notata

Binomial name
- Macaria notata (Linnaeus, 1758)

Synonyms
- Semiothisa notata

= Macaria notata =

Species of moth

Macaria notata, the peacock moth, is a moth of the family Geometridae. It is a Holarctic species.

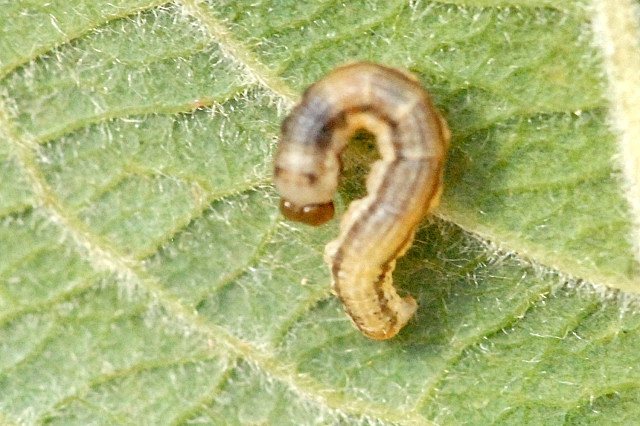
Caterpillar

== Distribution ==
Distributed in Central and North Europe, Russia Transcaucasia, Iran, Issyk Kul Russian Far East Siberia and Japan in the Palearctic. South Canada, Washington, Idaho, Montana, Oregon, Colorado, Connecticut, North Carolina, West Virginia, Virginia, Tennessee, NA.Georgia in the Nearctic.

== Description ==
The wingspan is 28–32 mm. The forewing has a small excision, or is at least faintly sinuous, in the anterior half of distal margin; 1st and 2nd subcostal stalked or more often coincident throughout, arising from cell. Hindwing whitish with moderate ochreous-grey dusting, a rust-coloured costal patch distally to the postmedian line of the forewing and a dark line round the distal marginal excision; the dark marks distally to the middle of the postmedian line are usually very well developed, but variable.

The combination of the black spot in the form of a paw print in the middle of the whitish grey brown speckled forewing, the well defined cut in the front half of the rear edge of the forewing and the strongly pointed rear wing, distinguishes notata from other Macaria with the exception of Macaria alternata. Certain identification requires examination of the genitalia.

The moth flies from May to June.

The caterpillars mainly feed on birch.

== Notes ==
1. The flight season refers to the British Isles. This may vary in other parts of the range.
