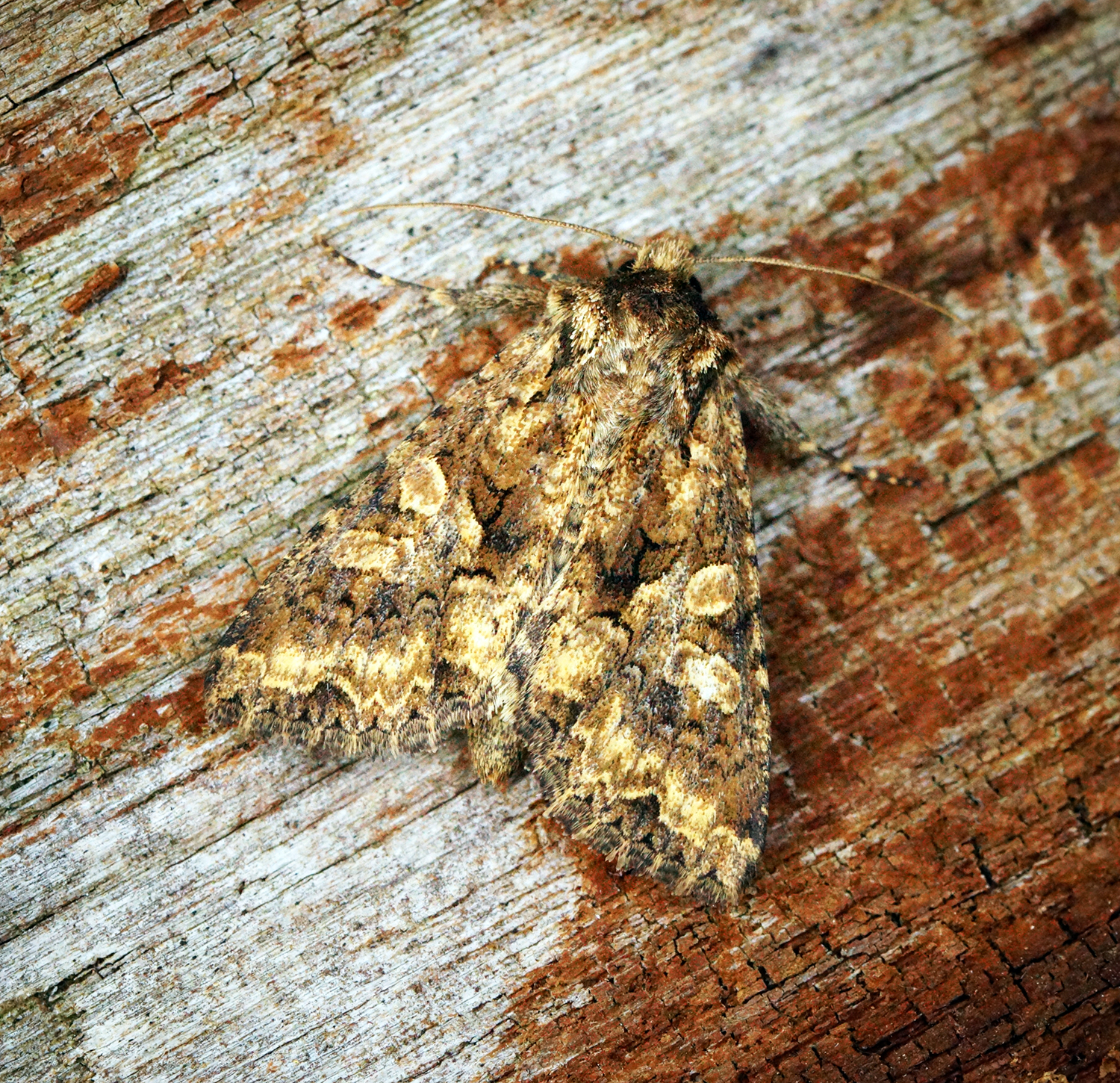

Scientific classification
- Kingdom: Animalia
- Phylum: Arthropoda
- Clade: Pancrustacea
- Class: Insecta
- Order: Lepidoptera
- Superfamily: Noctuoidea
- Family: Noctuidae
- Genus: Conisania
- Species: C. andalusica

Binomial name
- Conisania andalusica (Staudinger, 1859)

Synonyms
- List: Dianthoecia andalusica Staudinger, 1859; Hadena andalusica; Conisania (Luteohadena) andalusica; Dianthoecia gedrensis Schawerda, 1924; Dianthoecia barrettii Doubleday, 1864; Harmodia zernyi Draudt, 1934; Dianthoecia luteago var. barrettii

= Conisania andalusica =

Species of moth

Conisania andalusica, Barrett's marbled coronet, is a moth of the family Noctuidae. It was described by Otto Staudinger in 1859. It is found in Ireland, Great Britain, Germany and on the Iberian Peninsula. Outside of Europe, it is found in North Africa. It was described from the Sierra Nevada in Spain.

The wingspan is 35–39 mm for males and 39 mm for females. Forewing dark grey, mixed with ochreous; the two upper stigmata and a patch beneath them beyond claviform palest; hindwing blackish; the antennae of the male are said to bear strongly developed teeth. This species is very similar to Conisania luteago and separable only by genitalic characters.

Adults are on wing from June to August.

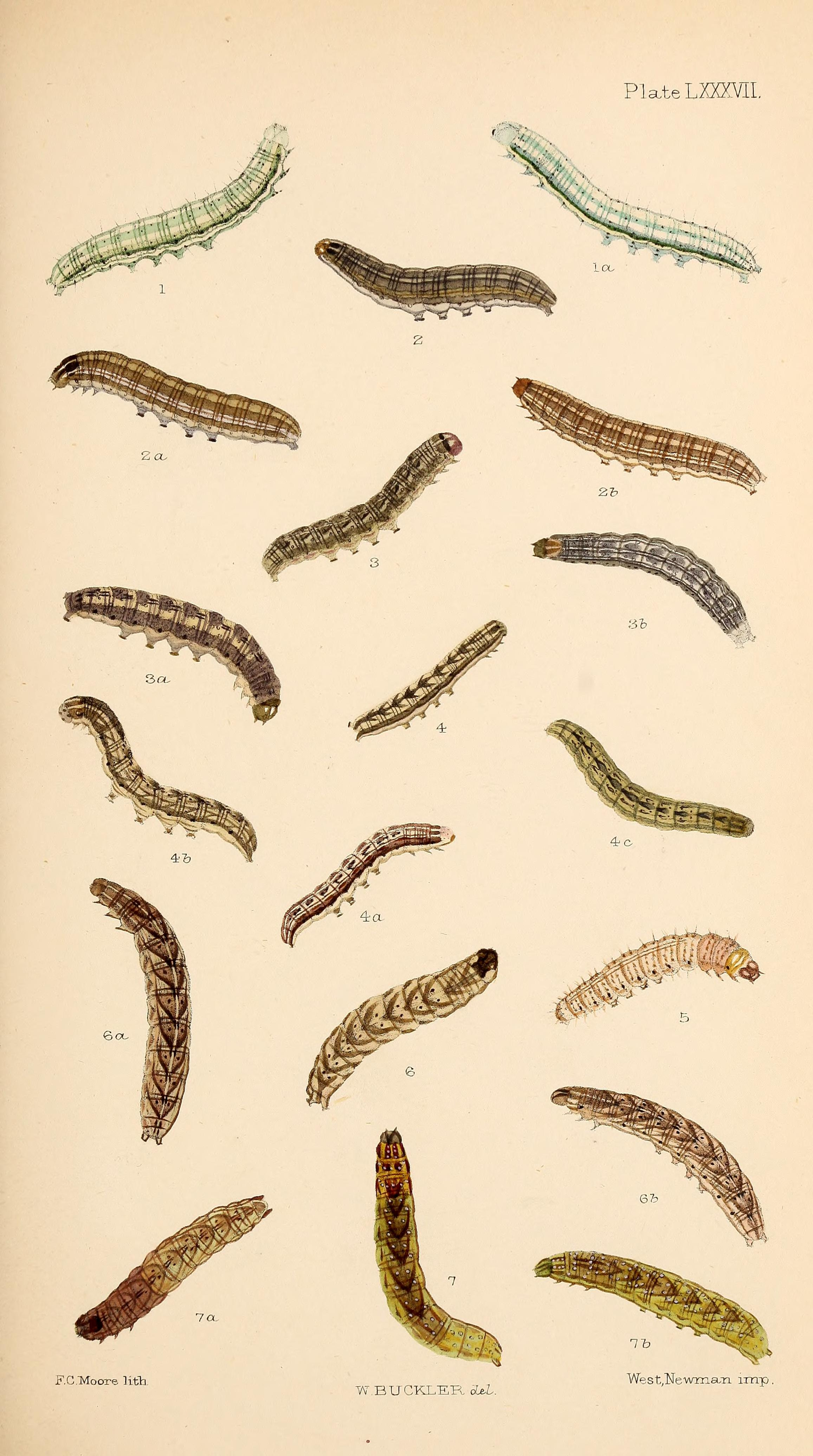
Figs.5 larvae after final moult

The larvae feed on flowering plants in the genus Silene.

== Subspecies ==
- Conisania andalusica andalusica
- Conisania andalusica barrettii (Doubleday, 1864) (Ireland)
- Conisania andalusica zernyi (Draudt, 1934) (Morocco)
