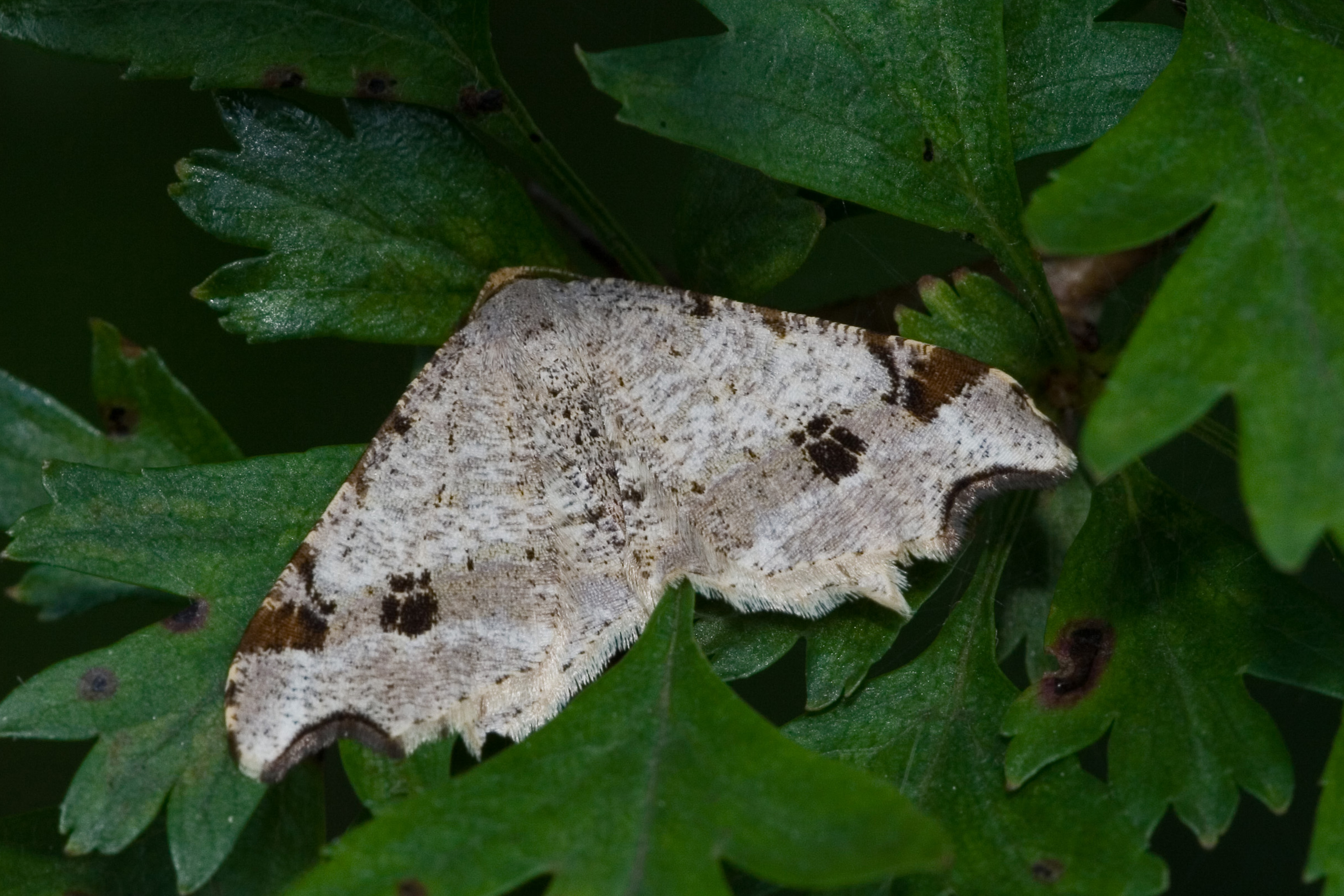

Scientific classification
- Kingdom: Animalia
- Phylum: Arthropoda
- Class: Insecta
- Order: Lepidoptera
- Family: Geometridae
- Genus: Macaria
- Species: M. alternata

Binomial name
- Macaria alternata (Denis & Schiffermüller, 1775)

Synonyms
- Semiothisa alternaria; Geometra alternata Denis & Schiffermüller, 1775; Macaria alternaria (Hübner, 1809)

= Macaria alternata =

Species of moth

Macaria alternata, the sharp-angled peacock, is a moth of the family Geometridae. It is found in Europe, Turkey, the Caucasus, Georgia and South Siberia.

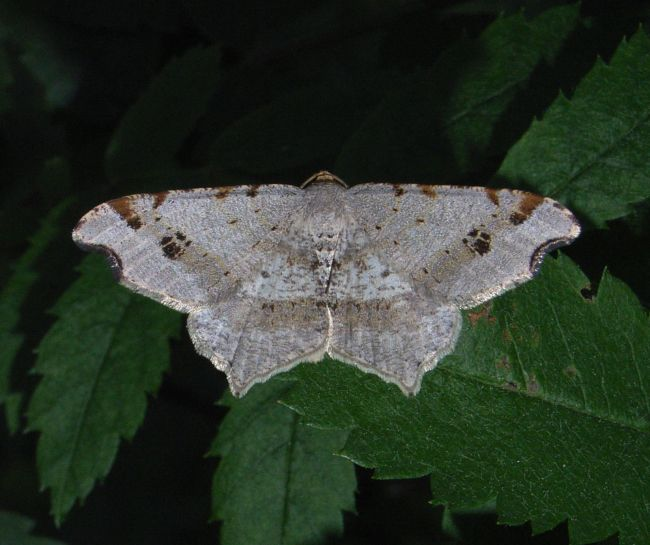

== Description ==
The wingspan is 22–27 mm (0.87–1.06 in). The moth closely resembles the peacock moth (Macaria notata) but can usually be recognized by the deeper cut on the forewing edge (hence the name) as well as the distinctly darker grey band through both wings. However, some specimens may require examination of the genitalia for certain identification.

The moth flies from May to June.

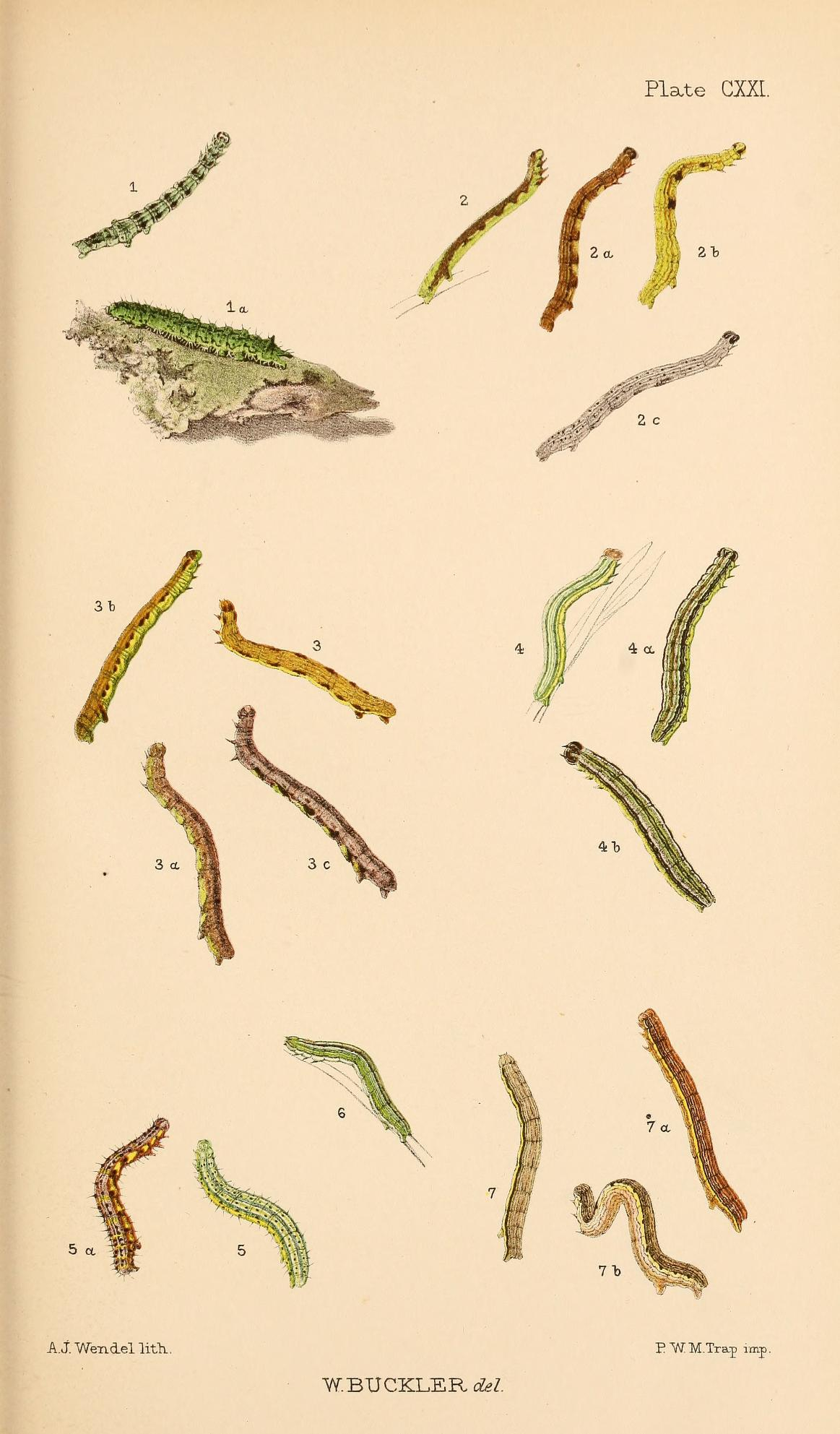
Figs 2, 2a, 2b, 2c larvae after final moult

The larva feeds on sallow, alder, blackthorn and sea-buckthorn.

== Notes ==
1. The flight season refers to the British Isles. This may vary in other parts of the range.
