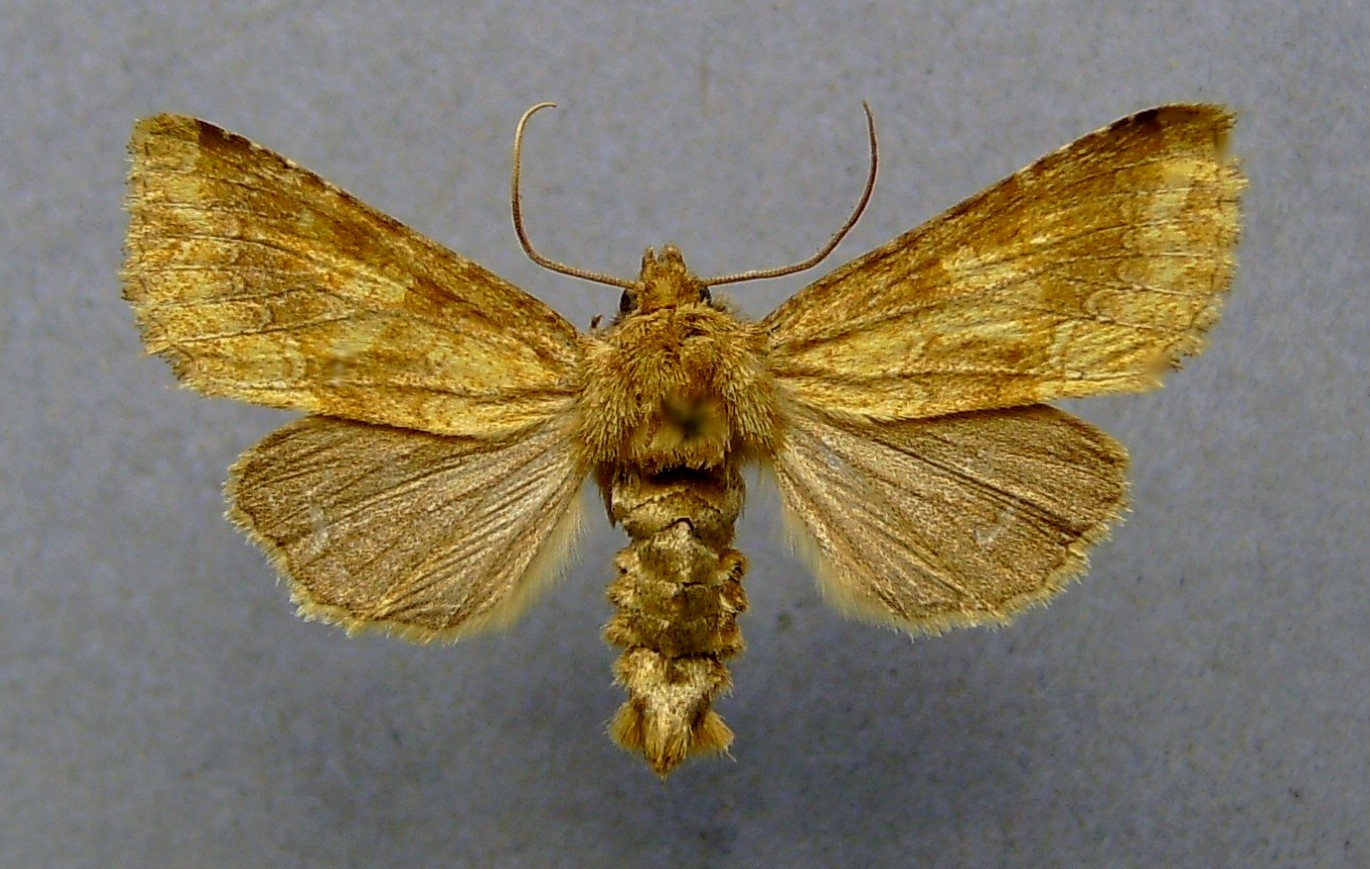

Scientific classification
- Domain: Eukaryota
- Kingdom: Animalia
- Phylum: Arthropoda
- Class: Insecta
- Order: Lepidoptera
- Superfamily: Noctuoidea
- Family: Noctuidae
- Genus: Conisania
- Species: C. luteago

Binomial name
- Conisania luteago (Denis & Schiffermüller, 1775)

Synonyms
- Noctua luteago Denis & Schiffermüller, 1775; Phalaena (Noctua) brunneago Esper, 1804; Noctua argillacea Hübner, [1813]; Dianthoecia luteago var. nigrescens Wagner, 1926; Hadena luteago (Denis & Schiffermüller, 1775); Hadena ottomana Koçak, 1990; Noctua olbiena Geyer, [1834]; Hadena behouneki de Freina, 1983

= Conisania luteago =

Barrett's marbled coronet

Species of moth

Conisania luteago, or Barrett's marbled coronet, is a species of moth of the family Noctuidae. It is found from France through south-eastern Europe to Central Asia. In the north it is found up to the Baltic region. It is also present in North Africa.

It was formerly included in the genus Hadena, but was transferred to Conisania by Hacker in 1996.

== Description ==
The wingspan is 29–40 mm. Warren (1914) states P. luteago Schiff. (= olbiena H.G) (16b). Forewing yellowish ochreous, with faintly darker, or with brownish shading in median and marginal areas; upper stigmata generally pale; the dark lines fairly distinct; hindwing fuscous yellowish, in the darker specimens more fuscous; veins and a postmedian line darker ab. brunneago Esp. (16 b) is the yellow form with the brown lines and shading well developed; the costa of forewing mottled with brownish. ab. argillacea Hbn. (16 b, c) is much more variegated, the dark markings being grey brown and the ground colour greyer ochreous; the hindwing dark brown; of this barrettii Dbld., [now species Conisania andalusica] from the coast of Ireland only, is an extreme form. Larva pale ochreous, sometimes pinkish, with brown dorsal vessel showing through and 4 fine tubercles on each segment; spiracles pale, black-ringed; head pink with black markings; feeds in summer in stems and roots of various kinds of Silene. Widely spread in Europe, occurring in Ireland, Guernsey, France, Spain, Italy, Corsica, Germany, Austria and Russia; in Algeria: also in Asia minor, Armenia, Persia, Turkestan, and Siberia. Conisania luteago is very similar to Conisania andalusica and separable only by genitalic characters.

== Subspecies ==
- Conisania luteago luteago
- Conisania luteago meridionalis (Brandt, 1938) (Iran, …)
- Conisania luteago olbiena (Geyer, [1834])
- Conisania luteago behouneki (de Freina, 1983) (Corsica, Sardinia)

== Biology ==
Adults are on wing from May to June.

The young larvae feed on roots and stems of various Silene species. They overwinter as a pupa.
