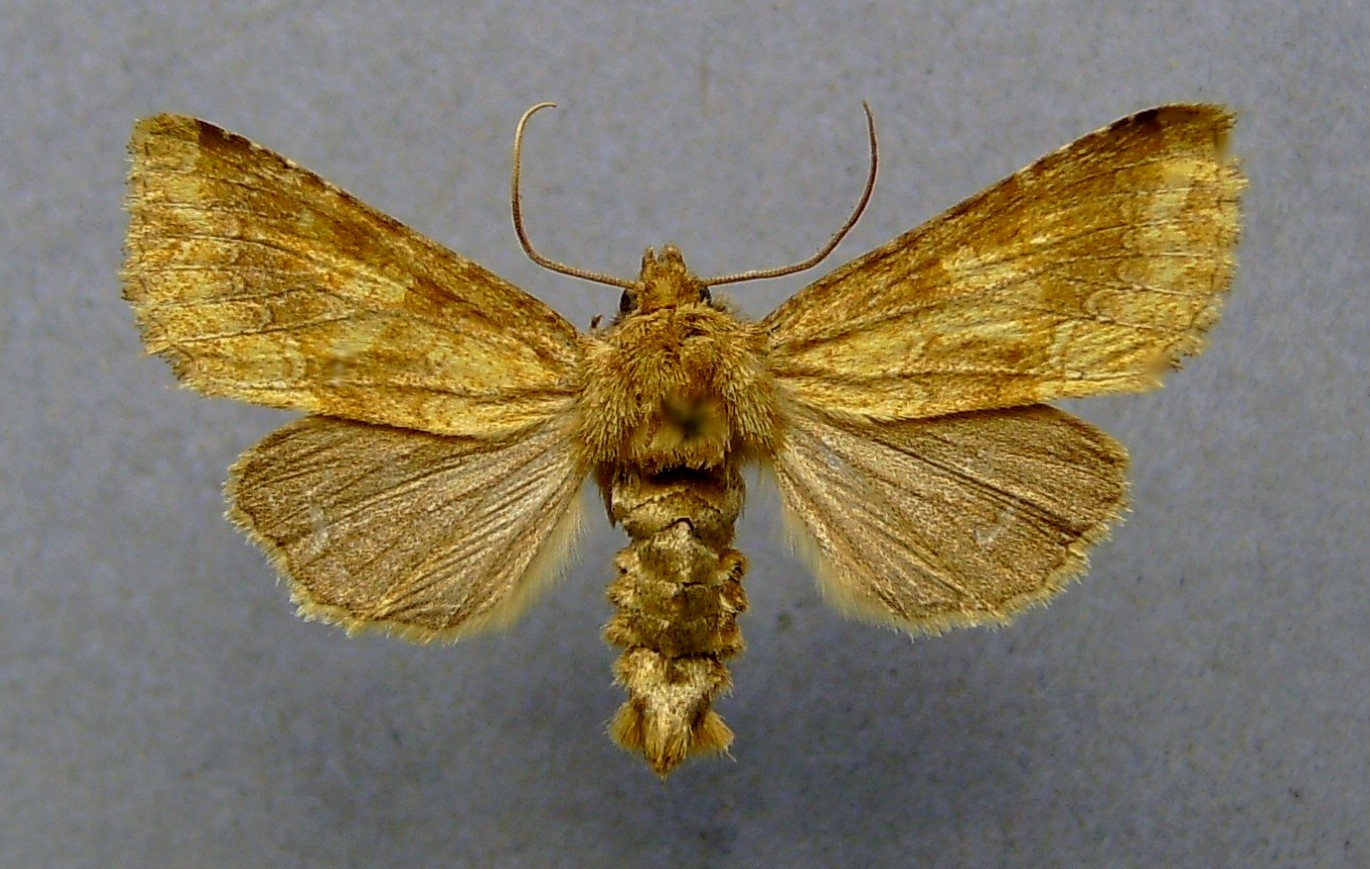
- Conisania luteago

Scientific classification
- Kingdom: Animalia
- Phylum: Arthropoda
- Class: Insecta
- Order: Lepidoptera
- Superfamily: Noctuoidea
- Family: Noctuidae
- Tribe: Hadenini
- Genus: Conisania; Hampson, 1905

= Conisania =

Genus of moths

Conisania is a genus of moths of the family Noctuidae.

== Species ==
- Conisania agrotoides Hacker & Speidel, 1992
- Conisania albina (Staudinger, 1896)
- Conisania andalusica (Staudinger, 1859)
- Conisania arida (Lederer, 1855)
- Conisania arterialis (Draudt, 1936)
- Conisania capsivora (Draudt, 1933)
- Conisania cervina (Eversmann, 1842)
- Conisania clara Ronkay, Varga & Gyulai, 1997
- Conisania dentirena Ronkay, Varga & Gyulai, 1997
- Conisania egenoides Boursin, 1966
- Conisania euxoides Hreblay & Ronkay, 1999
- Conisania evestigata (Draudt, 1936)
- Conisania hadulina (Draudt, 1934)
- Conisania lahoulicola Harcke & Varga, 1990
- Conisania leineri (Freyer, 1836)
- Conisania leuconephra (Draudt, 1950)
- Conisania literata (Fischer de Waldheim, 1840)
- Conisania luteago (Denis & Schiffermüller, 1775)
- Conisania mienshani (Draudt, 1950)
- Conisania oxyptera Gyulai & Varga, 1998
- Conisania poelli Stertz, 1915
- Conisania renati (Oberthür, 1890)
- Conisania ronkayi Yoshimoto, 1998
- Conisania roseipicta (Draudt, 1950)
- Conisania suaveola (Draudt, 1950)
- Conisania suavis (Staudinger, 1892)
- Conisania vargai Hreblay & Ronkay, 1999
- Conisania verhulsti Gyulai & Ronkay, 1995
- Conisania vidua (Staudinger, 1888)
- Conisania xanthothrix Boursin, 1960
