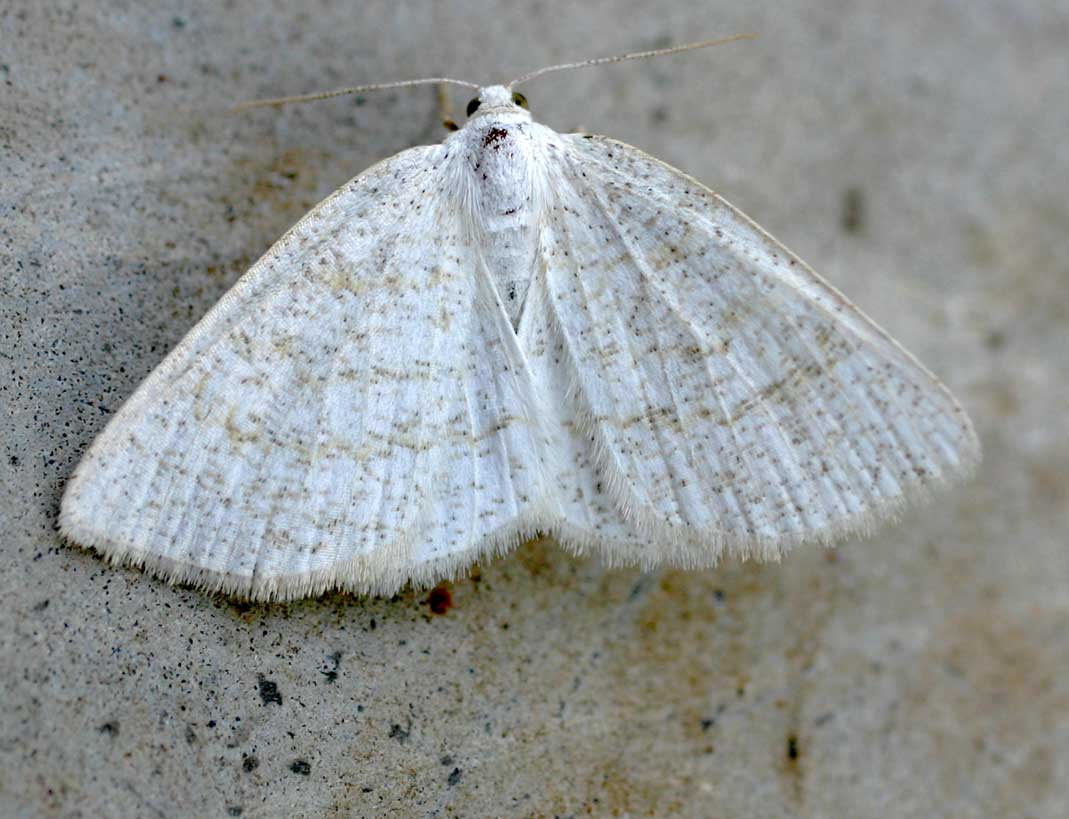
- Cabera exanthemata

Scientific classification
- Kingdom: Animalia
- Phylum: Arthropoda
- Class: Insecta
- Order: Lepidoptera
- Family: Geometridae
- Tribe: Caberini
- Genus: Cabera; Treitschke, 1825

= Cabera =

Genus of moths

Cabera is a genus of moths in the family Geometridae described by Georg Friedrich Treitschke in 1825.

== Description ==
These moths are widely distributed in the Palaearctic, Nearctic, Neotropic and Afrotropic regions, and a few in Indo-Australian regions. However, it is absent in Australia itself.

In the afrotropical region, 12 species have been recorded, though their placement in Cabera remains uncertain due to their variable physical characteristics. Among these is a monophyletic group, Cabera subalba group, which is distinct on the basis of its uniform appearance.

Some species were originally classified under Petelia and Gyalomia due to striking similarities.

== Selected species ==
This genus presently includes 30 species. In alphabetical order:

- Cabera aquaemontana (Prout, 1913)
- Cabera borealis (Hulst, 1896) – boreal cream
- Cabera candidaria (Leech, 1897)
- Cabera elarina (Prout, 1913)
- Cabera erythemaria (Guenée, 1857) – yellow-dusted cream
- Cabera exanthemata (Scopoli, 1763) – common wave
- Cabera griseolimbata (Oberthür, 1879)
- Cabera humbloti (Herbulot, 1978)
- Cabera leptographa (Wehrli, 1939)
- Cabera limbata (Herbulot, 1954)
- Cabera nathaliae (Herbulot, 1991)
- Cabera neodora (Prout, 1922)
- Cabera nevillei
- Cabera pseudognophos (Prout, 1917)
- Cabera purus (Butler, 1878)
- Cabera pusaria (Linnaeus, 1758) – common white wave
- Cabera quadrifasciaria (Packard, 1873) – four-lined cream
- Cabera schaefferi (Bremer, 1864)
- Cabera strigata (Warren, 1897)
- Cabera sulbaba (Warren, 1901)
- Cabera toulgoeti (Herbulot, 1957)
- Cabera variolaria (Guenée, 1857) – the vestal

== Etymology ==
Treitschke, a German lepidopterist, raised the genus in 1825; Cabera refers to Cabeiro, who was the daughter of Proteus ″the prophetic old man of the sea who kept changing his shape to avoid being caught and having to make prophesies″.
