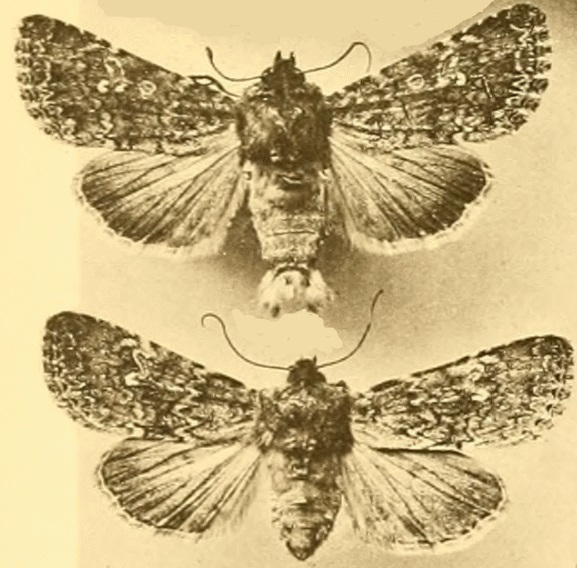

Scientific classification
- Kingdom: Animalia
- Phylum: Arthropoda
- Class: Insecta
- Order: Lepidoptera
- Superfamily: Noctuoidea
- Family: Noctuidae
- Genus: Conisania
- Species: C. poelli

Binomial name
- Conisania poelli Stertz, 1915

Synonyms
- Conisania ostrogovichi Draudt, 1933

= Conisania poelli =

Species of moth

Conisania poelli is a species of moth in the family Noctuidae. It is found in Austria, Switzerland, Italy, Romania, Daghestan and Russia.

== Subspecies ==
- Conisania poelli poelli
- Conisania poelli daghestanica Varga & Ronkay, 1991
- Conisania poelli ostrogovichi Draudt, 1933
