= Cabera quadrifasciaria =

Scientific classification
- Kingdom: Animalia
- Phylum: Arthropoda
- Clade: Pancrustacea
- Class: Insecta
- Order: Lepidoptera
- Family: Geometridae
- Genus: Cabera
- Species: C. quadrifasciaria

Binomial name
- Cabera quadrifasciaria (Packard, 1873)

Species of moth

Cabera quadrifasciaria, commonly known as the four-lined cabera moth or four-lined cream moth, is a species of geometrid moth in the family Geometridae. It is found in North America.
