= Cabera humbloti =

Scientific classification
- Kingdom: Animalia
- Phylum: Arthropoda
- Clade: Pancrustacea
- Class: Insecta
- Order: Lepidoptera
- Family: Geometridae
- Genus: Cabera
- Species: C. humbloti

Binomial name
- Cabera humbloti Herbulot 1978

Species of moth

Cabera humbloti is a species of geometrid moth, endemic to the Comoros archipelago, specifically the Grand Comoro. It belongs to the monophylectic Cabera subalba Group.

== Description ==
Cabera humbloti is a medium-sized Cabera species. The length of the forewing is 12–15 mm (0.47–0.59 in), and it is broad and pointed. The hindwing resembles the forewing, except it has a shorter point at the anal angle.

The closest known relative of C. humbloti is C. toulgoeti, a species endemic to the Madacasgar. Both share a diamond-shaped juxta with a central joint, a trait absent in the other members of the group.

== Appearance ==
Adults are distinguishable from other species in the group, as the forewings exhibit a less pointed apex. All three transverse lines on them are relatively well developed. The basal line is noticeably angled just below the costa; the median line is clearly defined in the male holotype but appears less prominent in the female allotype; the postmedian line is sharply developed, with a weak angle at the level of discal spots. Thes discal spots are quite prominent and are visible as having small white nuclei present on both pairs of wings.

On the hindwings, only the median and postmedian lines are present, with the postmedial lines forming a consistently smooth and convex curve. The underside is primarily whitish, having a grey suffusion in males and more subdued grey tone in females. A strong purple shade is particularly observed in the female specimens.

=== Male genitalia ===
Males contain a relatively short uncus, a hook-like structure at the terminal end. The soccii lobes are prominent, nearly equalling the uncus in length, arising from its dorsal base. Their genital capsule and its 9th ventral segment, or the vinculum, is markedly narrower than the tegumen, and contains a pronounced median suture. Both of these structures are evenly elliptical. A very narrow transtilla (band of connective tissue at the base of valvae) is present. The pair of valvae are elongated and tongue-shaped, shorter than other Cabera species, narrowing pointedly towards the tip. There are clusters of very dense setae on the apical region of these claspers. The saccus is lined with a group of fine setae, with no swelling along the centre of dorsal margin. The inseminating organ, aedaegus, is slender and cylindrical, which is quite different from 'spindle-shaped' ones in the related species. spindle-shaped. The sheath that surrounds it, the vesica, is equipped with three nail-like subapical cornuti, protruding froim a region that spans approximately one-third of the aedeagus length and covered with numerous microcornuti.

The distinctive genital morphology suggests that C. humbloti occupies an isolated taxonomic position within the Cabera subalba species group. The species demonstrates pronounced sexual dimorphism, with notable differences in the appearance of males and females.
