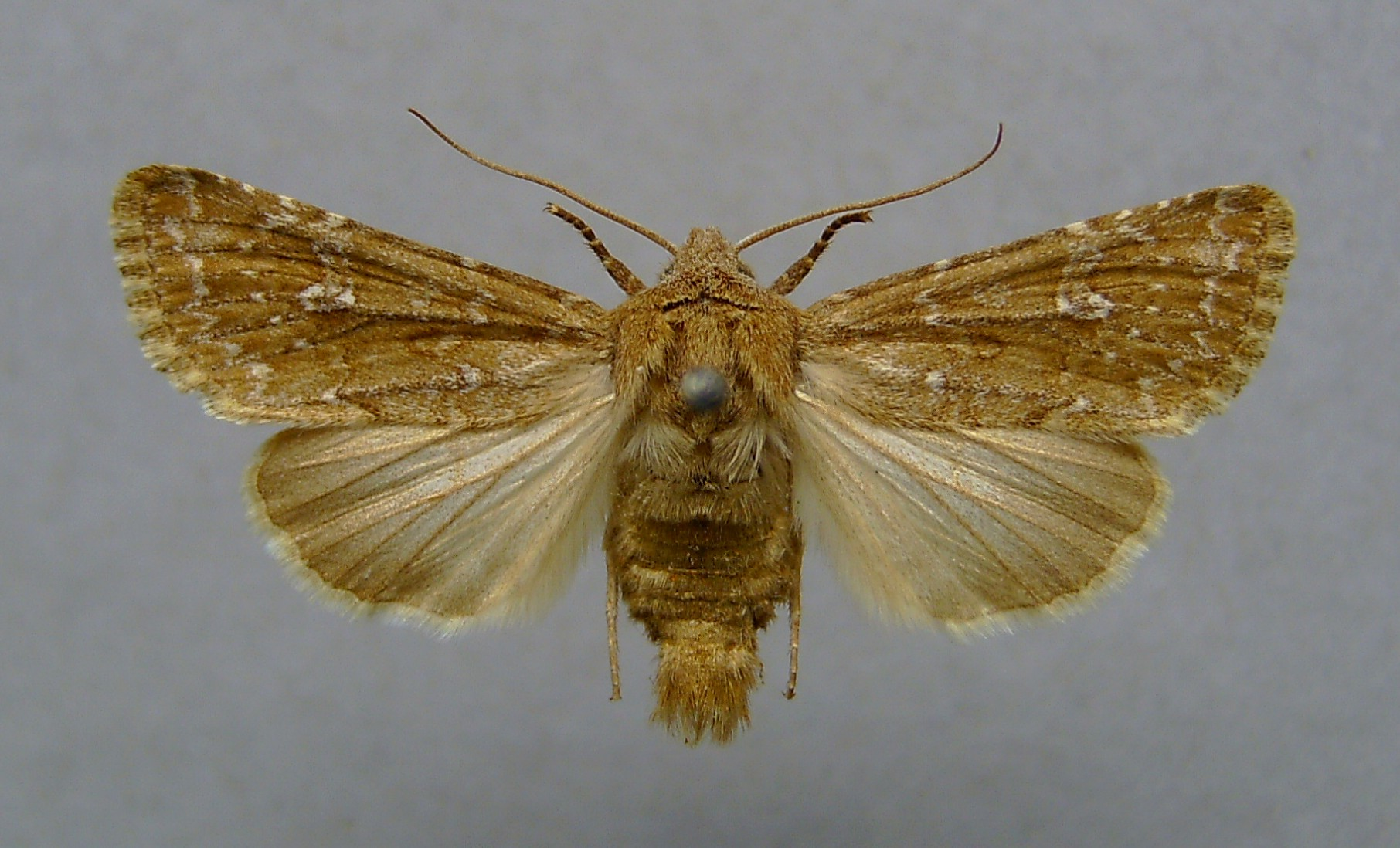

Scientific classification
- Domain: Eukaryota
- Kingdom: Animalia
- Phylum: Arthropoda
- Class: Insecta
- Order: Lepidoptera
- Superfamily: Noctuoidea
- Family: Noctuidae
- Genus: Conisania
- Species: C. leineri

Binomial name
- Conisania leineri (Freyer, 1836)

Synonyms
- Apamea leineri Freyer, 1836; Mamestra albina Staudinger, 1896; Mamestra bovina Staudinger, 1888; Mamestra cervina Eversmann, 1842; Leucania furcata Eversmann, 1837; Mamestra pomerana Schulz, 1869

= Conisania leineri =

Species of moth

Conisania leineri is a species of moth of the family Noctuidae. It is found in Central Europe, along the Baltic Sea coast, eastward to the southern Ural.

The wingspan is 29–36 mm. Adults are on wing from May to July in one generation per year. Adults feed on the flower nectar of Syringa species.

The young larvae feed on roots and stems of various Artemisia species, including Artemisia campestris. Larvae are found in July and August. They overwinter as a pupa.

== Subspecies ==
- Conisania leineri leineri
- Conisania leineri furcata (Eversmann, 1837)
- Conisania leineri pomerana (Schulz, 1869)
