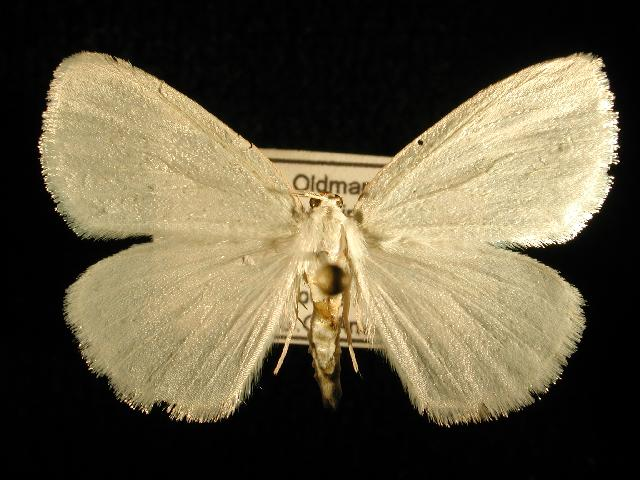

Scientific classification
- Kingdom: Animalia
- Phylum: Arthropoda
- Class: Insecta
- Order: Lepidoptera
- Family: Geometridae
- Tribe: Caberini
- Genus: Cabera
- Species: C. variolaria

Binomial name
- Cabera variolaria Guenée in Boisduval & Guenée, 1858

= Cabera variolaria =

Species of moth

Cabera variolaria, known generally as the vestal or pink-striped willow spanworm, is a species of geometrid moth in the family Geometridae. It is found in North America.

The MONA or Hodges number for Cabera variolaria is 6678.
