= Cabera limbata =

Scientific classification
- Domain: Eukaryota
- Kingdom: Animalia
- Phylum: Arthropoda
- Class: Insecta
- Order: Lepidoptera
- Family: Geometridae
- Genus: Cabera
- Species group: Cabera subalba group
- Species: C. limbata

Binomial name
- Cabera limbata Herbulot, 1954

Species of moth

Cabera limbata is a species of geometrid moths, found in Guinea, Ghana, Ivory Coast, and Cameroon in West Africa. It belongs to the monophyletic Cabera subalba group.

== Taxonomy ==
This moth was previously named Thysanopyga limbata (Herbulot, 1954). It was also referred to as Cabera limbala in some instances (Scoble, 1999: 98).

== Description ==
Cabera limbata is a medium-sized Cabera species. The length of the forewing is 12–15 mm (0.47–0.59 in), and is broad and pointed. The hindwing resembles the forewing, but with a shorter point at anal angle.

The upperside closely resembles that of Cabera toulgoeti from Madagascar. However, it differs on the basis of having smaller discal spots and a darker underside terminal color.

It is the only other moth, except Cabera subalba, that has a single cornutus (spine-like structure) in the vesica. To differentiate between these two species, variations in the valvae and soccii lobes are considered, as they are much broader and larger in C. subalba, respectively. In some cases, differentiation is also done by coloration, as it is paler than C. subalba, resulting in the striations appearing bolder.

== Appearance ==
Adults feature weakly defined lines along the forewings, along with a median line which is relatively broader. It is undulating and runs just before the discal spot. Forewings contain fine darker grey striations than ground brown colour. Discal spots on the forewing and black, while the ones on hindwing are nearly invisible due to their ochreous coloration. The underside of the wings is significantly lighter than the upperside, which features a contrasting and well developed darker violet-grey terminal shade along the edges, gradually darkening slightly towards the hindwing. The cilia and body vestiture are consistent in color with the wings.

=== Male genitalia ===
Adults are distinguished by a lengthy, acutely pointed, and setose uncus, a hook-like structure at the terminal end. The soccii lobes are also setose and prominent, arising from the basal region of uncus. Its genital capsule is wide and elliptical, with its 9th ventral segment, or vinculum, having a notable median suture. It has a well developed transtilla (band of connective tissue at the base of valvae), with the pair of valvae being broad at their basal two-thirds, featuring a deep indentation (sacculus) that gradually narrows sharply towards the apex.

The dorsal margin of the valvae is swollen from the center, and has a middle group of setae. The apical margin, whereas, contains multiple groups of stout setae. The inseminating organ, the aedaegus, is short and spindle-shaped. The sheath surrounding it or the vesica, contains a single nail-like cornutus at its tip.
