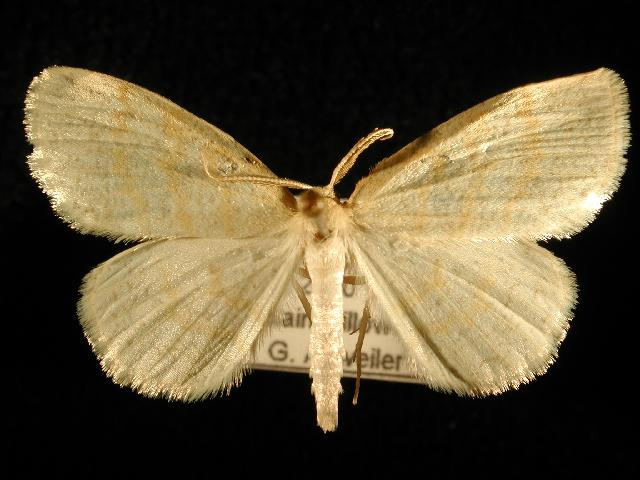

Scientific classification
- Kingdom: Animalia
- Phylum: Arthropoda
- Class: Insecta
- Order: Lepidoptera
- Family: Geometridae
- Genus: Cabera
- Species: C. erythemaria

Binomial name
- Cabera erythemaria Guenée in Boisduval & Guenée, 1858

= Cabera erythemaria =

Species of moth

Cabera erythemaria, the yellow-dusted cream, is a species of geometrid moth in the family Geometridae. It is found in North America.

The MONA or Hodges number for Cabera erythemaria is 6677.
