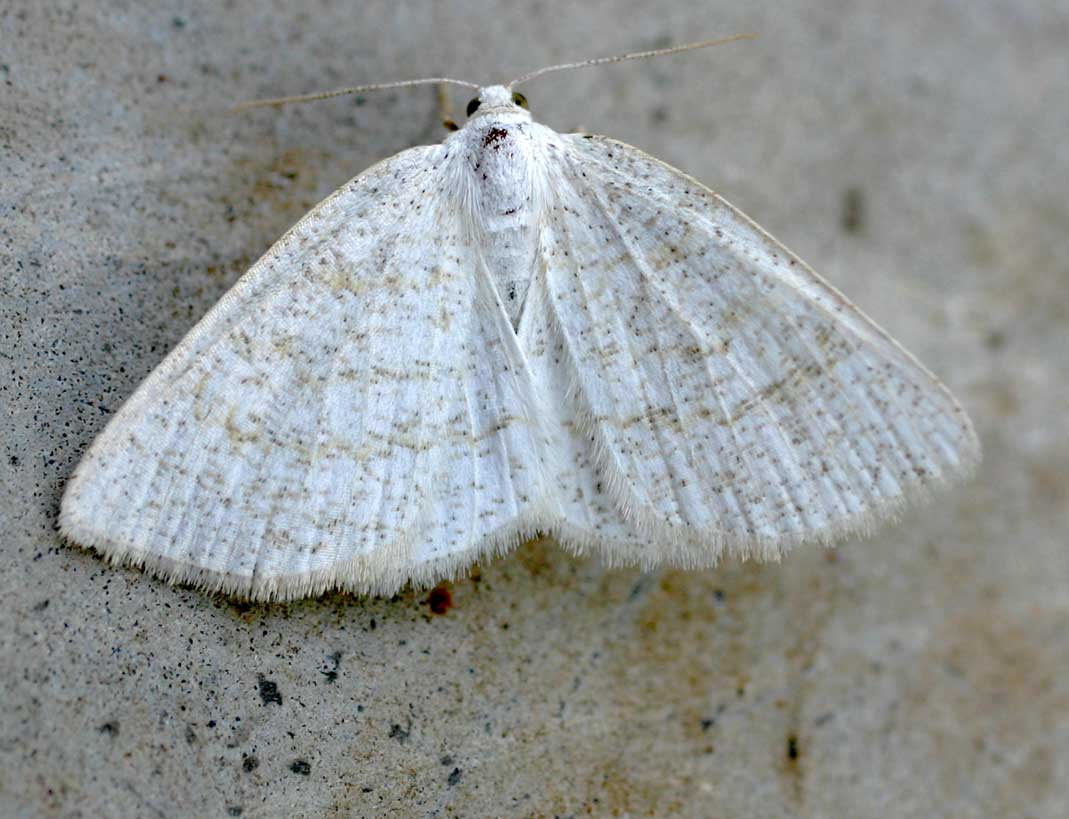

Scientific classification
- Kingdom: Animalia
- Phylum: Arthropoda
- Clade: Pancrustacea
- Class: Insecta
- Order: Lepidoptera
- Family: Geometridae
- Genus: Cabera
- Species: C. exanthemata

Binomial name
- Cabera exanthemata (Scopoli, 1763)

= Common wave =

Species of moth

The common wave (Cabera exanthemata) is a moth of the family Geometridae. The species was first described by Giovanni Antonio Scopoli in his 1763 Entomologia Carniolica. It is found throughout the Palearctic region and the Near East.

The wings of this species are white, heavily spotted with tiny yellowish dots, which give it a buffish appearance. The wings are marked with narrow brown fascia, three on the forewing, two on the hindwing. ab. arenosaria Haw. (= nogentina Th.-Mieg) is darker, more strongly dusted, the lines sometimes scarcely or not at all differentiated. ab. approximaria Haw. has the first two lines closely approximated, almost coalescent.ab. pellagraria Guen. is said to be larger, apex of forewing more produced, colour whiter, less irrorated, lines perhaps less waved, both wings with a black discal dot. Lyons. — ab. unicolorata Teich, almost unicolorous white, is said to be a prevalent form in Livonia. — The wingspan is 30–35 mm. The egg is oval, green, with fine reticulation. The larva is very variable, green or brown, usually with dark dorsal markings and sometimes with white dots.

One or two broods are produced each year and adults can be seen at any time between May and August. This species flies at night and is attracted to light.

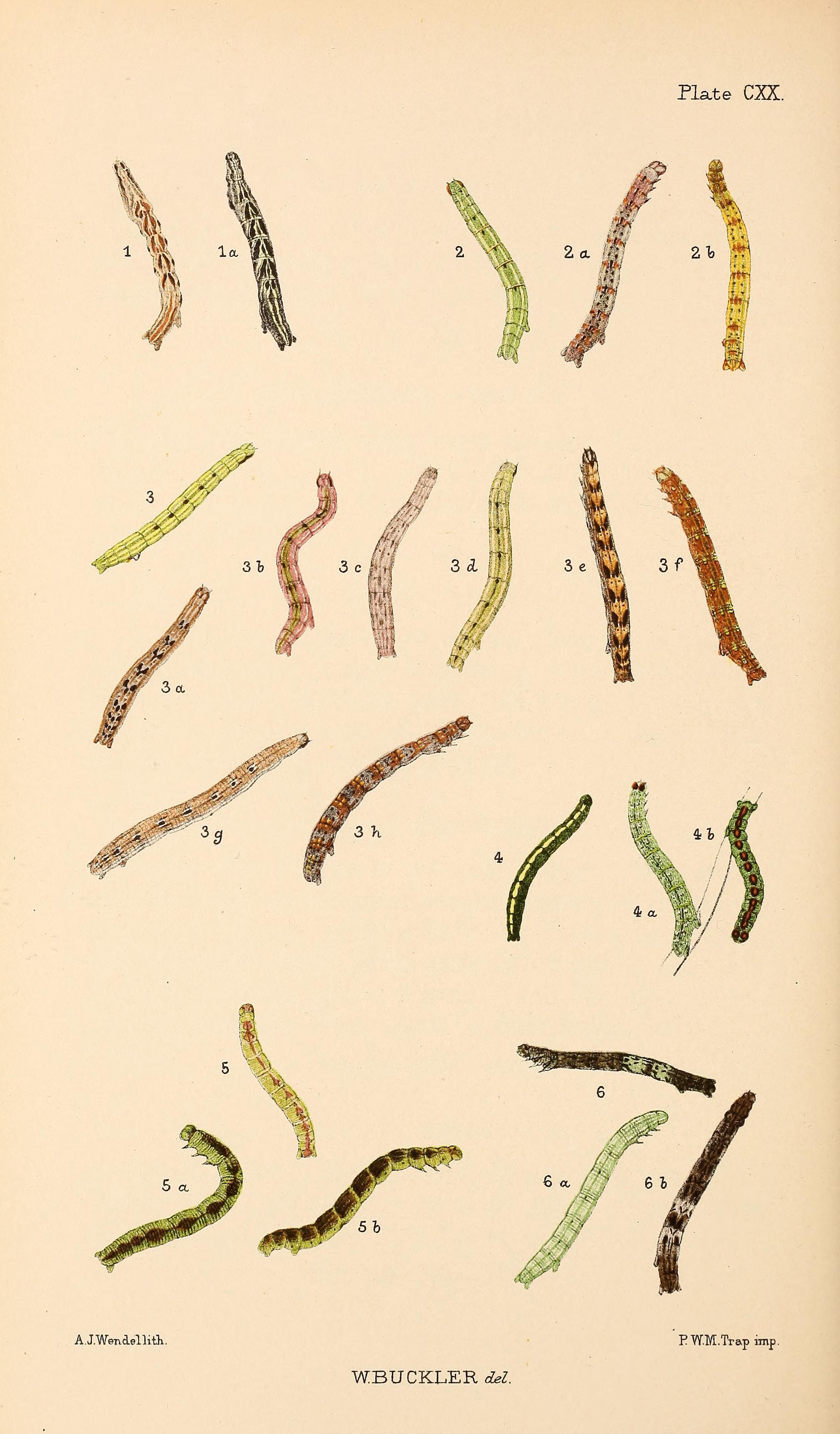
3,3a,3b,3c.3d,3e.3f,3g,3h larvae in various stages

The larva, in the British Isles green with yellow rings and black and purple spots, feeds on alder, aspen, beech, birch and willow. The species overwinters as a pupa.

== Notes ==
1. The flight season refers to the British Isles. This may vary in other parts of the range.
