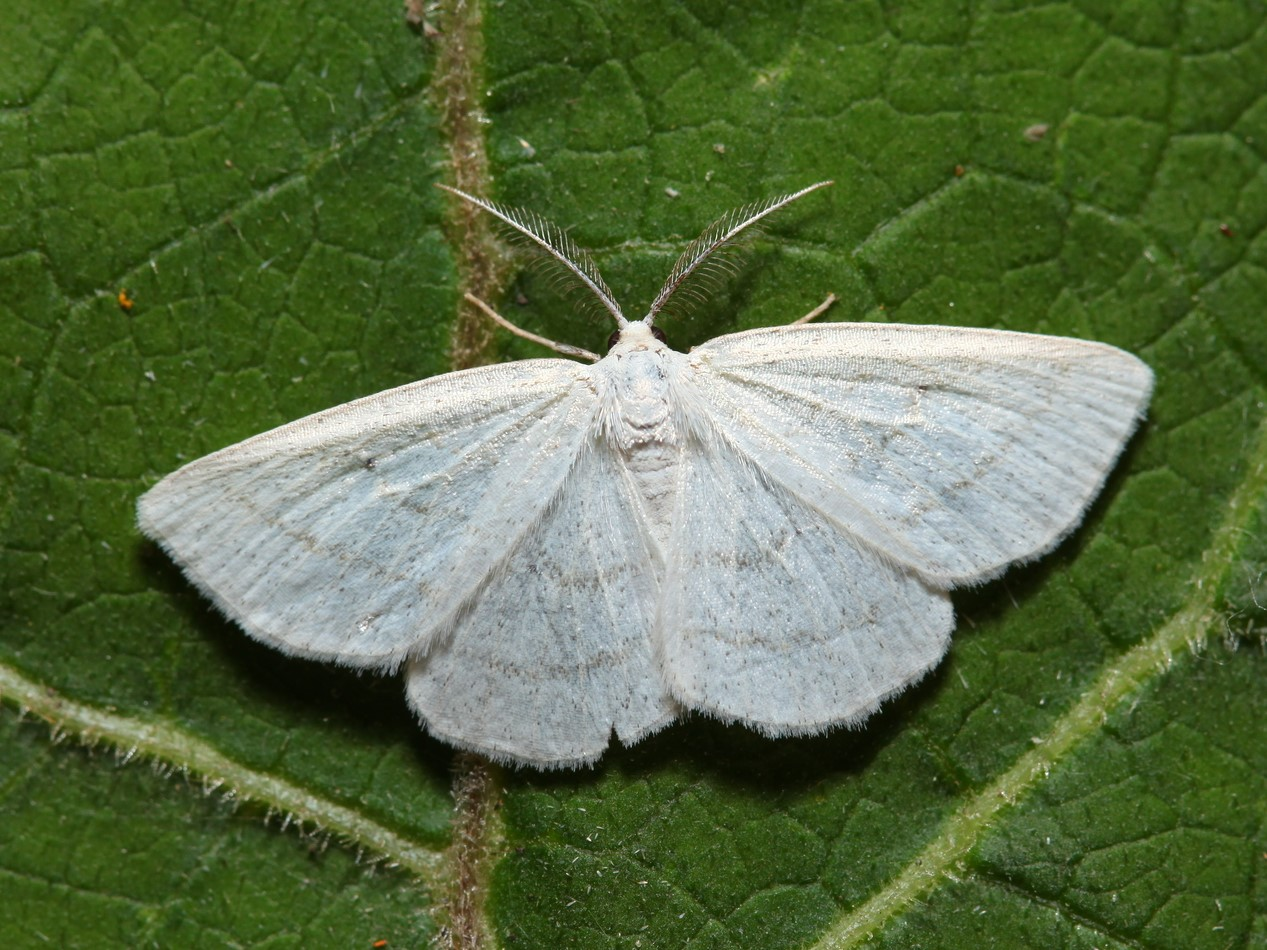

Scientific classification
- Kingdom: Animalia
- Phylum: Arthropoda
- Class: Insecta
- Order: Lepidoptera
- Family: Geometridae
- Genus: Cabera
- Species: C. leptographa

Binomial name
- Cabera leptographa Wehrli, 1936

= Cabera leptographa =

Species of moth

Cabera leptographa is a species of moth in the family Geometridae.

It is native to the Palearctic.
