= Cabera toulgoeti =

Scientific classification
- Kingdom: Animalia
- Phylum: Arthropoda
- Class: Insecta
- Order: Lepidoptera
- Family: Geometridae
- Genus: Cabera
- Species: C. toulgoeti

Binomial name
- Cabera toulgoeti Herbulot 1957

Species of moth

Cabera toulgoeti is a species of geometrid moth, endemic to the Pennel area of Moramanga district of Analamazaotra Forest in Madagascar. It belongs to the monophylectic Cabera subalba Group.

== Description ==
Cabera toulgoeti is a medium-sized Cabera species. The length of the forewing is 12–15 mm (0.47–0.59 in), and it is broad and pointed. The hindwing resembles the forewing, except it has a shorter point at the anal angle.

It is disinguished from other species in its group by having moderately well-defined lines on the forewings. However, in comparison to the closest related species, Cabera limbata, the median line is notably much narrower. Furthermore, the discal spots on the upperside of forewing are more prominent in C. toulgoeti. The dorsal side of both of the species bears striking resemblance, but could be differentiated by the less developed terminal shade on the underside of C. toulgoeti. It is also the closest known relative of the species Cabera humbloti, endemic to the Comoros.

== Appearance ==
The forewings feature relatively small discal spots, while the spots on the hindwings are faded or almost absent. The terminal shade on the underside is poorly developed on both pair of wings and is barely discernible on the hindwing.

=== Male genitalia ===
Males contain a long and sharply pointed, setose uncus, a hook-like structure at the terminal end. The soccii lobes are prominent, and densely covered with setae that arise from the base of uncus. Their genital capsule is broadly elliptical, while the 9th ventral segment, or the vinculum, contains a pronounced median suture. A very well-developed transtilla (band of connective tissue at the base of valvae) is present. The pair of valvae are elongated and narrow, with little swelling and groups of setae along the centre of dorsal margin. There is a group of very thick setae on the apical region of these claspers. The juxta is diamond-shaped and contains a central joint. The inseminating organ, aedaegus, is very large for its genus, and spindle-shaped. The sheath that surrounds it, the vesica, contains a packed group of four five lean, nail-like cornuti at its apex.
