= Striation (fatigue) =

Lines in a material caused by fatigue

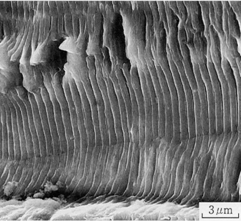
Scanning electron microscope image of fatigue striations produced from constant amplitude loading. The crack is growing from left to right.

Striations are marks produced on the fracture surface that show the incremental growth of a fatigue crack. A striation marks the position of the crack tip at the time it was made. The term striation generally refers to ductile striations which are rounded bands on the fracture surface separated by depressions or fissures and can have the same appearance on both sides of the mating surfaces of the fatigue crack. Although some research has suggested that many loading cycles are required to form a single striation, it is now generally thought that each striation is the result of a single loading cycle.

The presence of striations is used in failure analysis as an indication that a fatigue crack has been growing. Striations are generally not seen when a crack is small even though it is growing by fatigue, but will begin to appear as the crack becomes larger. Not all periodic marks on the fracture surface are striations. The size of a striation for a particular material is typically related to the magnitude of the loading characterised by stress intensity factor range, the mean stress and the environment. The width of a striation is indicative of the overall crack growth rate but can be locally faster or slower on the fracture surface.

== Striation features ==
The study of the fracture surface is known as fractography. Images of the crack can be used to reveal features and understand the mechanisms of crack growth. While striations are fairly straight, they tend to curve at the ends allowing the direction of crack growth to be determined from an image. Striations generally form at different levels in metals and are separated by a tear band between them. Tear bands are approximately parallel to the direction of crack growth and produce what is known as a river pattern, so called, because it looks like the diverging pattern seen with river flows. The source of the river pattern converges to a single point that is typically the origin of the fatigue failure.

Striations can appear on both sides of the mating fracture surface. There is some dispute as to whether striations produced on both sides of the fracture surface match peak-to-peak or peak-to-valley. The shape of striations may also be different on each side of the fracture surface. Striations do not occur uniformly over all of the fracture surface and many areas of a fatigue crack may be devoid of striations. Striations are most often observed in metals but also occur in plastics such as Poly(methyl_methacrylate).

Small striations can be seen with the aid of a scanning electron microscope. Once the size of a striation is over 500 nm (resolving wavelength of light), they can be seen with an optical microscope. The first image of striations was taken by Zapffe and Worden in 1951 using an optical microscope.

The width of a striation indicates the local rate of crack growth and is typical of the overall rate of growth over the fracture surface. The rate of growth can be predicted with a crack growth equation such as the Paris-Erdogan equation. Defects such as inclusions and grain boundaries may locally slow down the rate of growth.

Variable amplitude loads produce striations of different widths and the study of these striation patterns has been used to understand fatigue. Although various cycle counting methods can be used to extract the equivalent constant amplitude cycles from a variable amplitude sequence, the striation pattern differs from the cycles extracted using the rainflow counting method.

The height of a striation has been related to the stress ratio $R$ of the applied loading cycle, where $R = K_\text{min}/K_\text{max}$ and is thus a function of the minimum $K_\text{min}$ and maximum $K_\text{max}$ stress intensity of the applied loading cycle.

The striation profile depends on the degree of loading and unloading in each cycle. The unloading part of the cycle causing plastic deformation on the surface of the striation. Crack extension only occurs from the rising part of the load cycle.

== Striation-like features ==
Other periodic marks on the fracture surface can be mistaken for striations.

=== Marker bands ===
Variable amplitude loading causes cracks to change the plane of growth and this effect can be used to create marker bands on the fracture surface. When a number of constant amplitude cycles are applied they may produce a plateau of growth on the fracture surface. Marker bands (also known as progression marks or beach marks) may be produced and readily identified on the fracture surface even though the magnitude of the loads may too small to produce individual striations.

In addition, marker bands may also be produced by large loads (also known as overloads) producing a region of fast fracture on the crack surface. Fast fracture can produce a region of rapid extension before blunting of the crack tip stops the growth and further growth occurs during fatigue. Fast fracture occurs through a process of microvoid coalescence where failures initiate around inter-metallic particles. The F111 aircraft was subjected to periodic proof testing to ensure any cracks present were smaller than a certain critical size. These loads left marks on the fracture surface that could be identified, allowing the rate of intermediate growth occurring in service to be measured.

Marks also occur from a change in the environment where oil or corrosive environments can deposit or from excessive heat exposure and colour the fracture surface up to the current position of the crack tip.

Marker bands may be used to measure the instantaneous rate of growth of the applied loading cycles. By applying a repeated sequence separated by loads that produce a distinctive pattern the growth from each segment of loading can be measured using a microscope in a technique called quantitative fractography, the rate of growth for loading segments of constant amplitude or variable amplitude loading can be directly measured from the fracture surface.

=== Tyre tracks ===
Tyre tracks are the marks on the fracture surface produced by something making an impression onto the surface from the repeated opening and closing of the crack faces. This can be produced by either a particle that becomes trapped between the crack faces or the faces themselves shifting and directly contacting the opposite surface.

=== Coarse striations ===
Coarse striations are a general rumpling of the fracture surface and do not correspond to a single loading cycle and are therefore not considered to be true striations. They are produced instead of regular striations when there is insufficient atmospheric moisture to form hydrogen on the surface of the crack tip in aluminium alloys, thereby preventing the slip planes activation. The wrinkles in the surface cross over and so do not represent the position of the crack tip.

== Striation formation in aluminium ==
=== Environmental influence ===
Striations are often produced in high strength aluminium alloys. In these alloys, the presence of water vapour is necessary to produce ductile striations, although too much water vapour will produce brittle striations also known as cleavage striations. Brittle striations are flatter and larger than ductile striations produced with the same load. There is sufficient water vapour present in the atmosphere to generate ductile striations. Cracks growing internally are isolated from the atmosphere and grow in a vacuum. When water vapour deposits onto the freshly exposed aluminium fracture surface, it dissociates into hydroxides and atomic hydrogen. Hydrogen interacts with the crack tip affecting the appearance and size of the striations. The growth rate increases typically by an order of magnitude, with the presence of water vapour. The mechanism is thought to be hydrogen embrittlement as a result of hydrogen being absorbed into the plastic zone at the crack tip.

When an internal crack breaks through to the surface, the rate of crack growth and the fracture surface appearance will change due to the presence of water vapour. Coarse striations occur when a fatigue crack grows in a vacuum such as when growing from an internal flaw.

=== Cracking plane ===
In aluminium (a face-centred cubic material), cracks grow close to low index planes such as the {100} and the {110} planes (see Miller Index). Both of these planes bisect a pair of slip planes. Crack growth involving a single slip plane is term Stage I growth and crack growth involving two slip planes is termed Stage II growth. Striations are typically only observed in Stage II growth.

Brittle striations are typically formed on {100} planes.

== Models of striation formation ==
There have been many models developed to explain the process of how a striation is formed and their resultant shape. Some of the significant models are:

- Plastic blunting model of Laird
- Saw-tooth model of McMillan and Pelloux
- Coarse slip model of Neumman
- Shear band model by Zhang
