= Lepidoptera genitalia =

Study of the genitalia of butterflies and moths

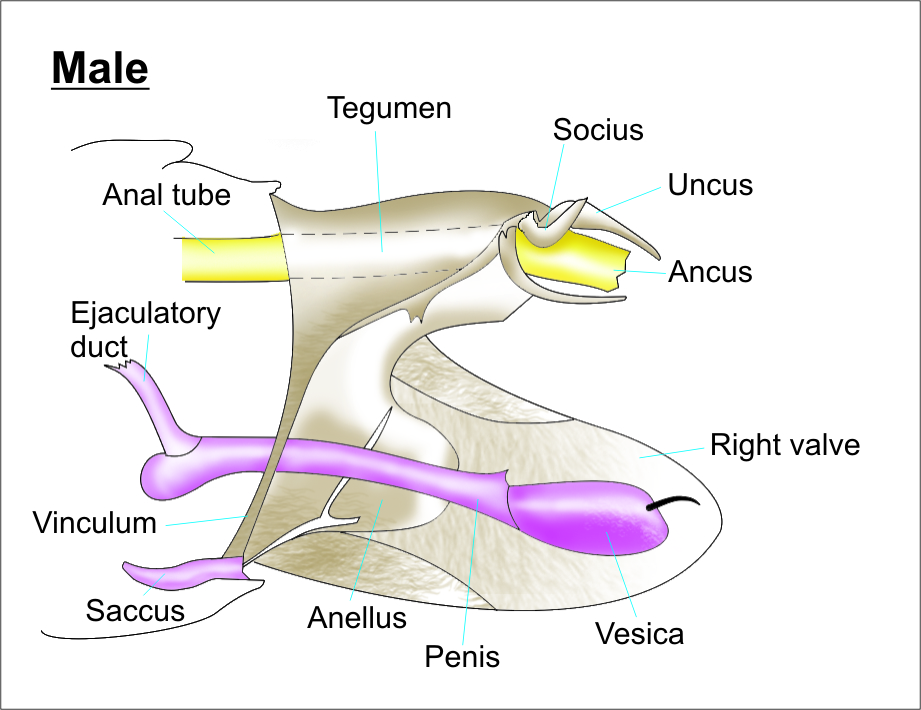
Male genitalia of Lepidoptera

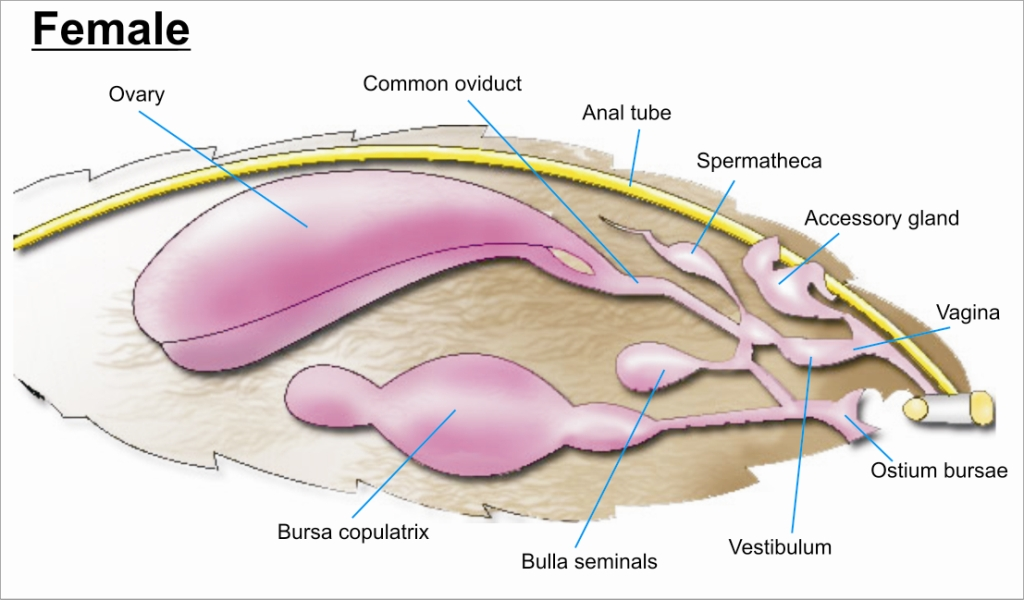
Female genitalia of Lepidoptera

The study of the genitalia of Lepidoptera is important for Lepidoptera taxonomy in addition to development, anatomy and natural history. The genitalia are complex and provide the basis for species discrimination in most families and also in family identification. The genitalia are attached onto the tenth or most distal segment of the abdomen. Lepidoptera have some of the most complex genital structures in the insect groups with a wide variety of complex spines, setae, scales and tufts in males, claspers of different shapes and different modifications of the ductus bursae in females.

The arrangement of genitalia is important in the courtship and mating as they prevent cross-specific mating and hybridisation. The uniqueness of genitalia of a species led to the use of the morphological study of genitalia as one of the most important keys in taxonomic identification of taxa below family level. With the advent of DNA analysis, the study of genitalia has now become just one of the techniques used in taxonomy.

== Configurations ==
There are three basic configurations of genitalia in the majority of the Lepidoptera based on how the arrangement in females of openings for copulation, fertilisation and egg-laying has evolved:

- Exoporian : Hepialidae and related families have an external groove that carries sperm from the copulatory opening (gonopore) to the (ovipore) and are termed Exoporian.
- Monotrysian : Primitive groups have a single genital aperture near the end of the abdomen through which both copulation and egg laying occur. This character is used to designate the Monotrysia.
- Ditrysian : The remaining groups have an internal duct that carry sperm and form the Ditrysia, with two distinct openings each for copulation and egg-laying.

== Male ==
Genitalia in male and female of any particular Lepidopteran species are adapted to fit each other like a lock (female) and key (male). In males, the ninth abdominal segment is divided into a dorsal 'tegumen' and ventral 'vinculum'. They form a ring-like structure for the attachment of genital parts and a pair of lateral clasping organs (claspers, valvae (singular valva), or 'harpes'). The male has a median tubular organ (called aedeagus or phallus) which is extended through an eversible sheath (or 'vesica') to inseminate the female. The males have paired sperm ducts in all Lepidopterans; however, the paired testes are separate in basal taxa and fused in advanced forms.

The males of many species of Papilionoidea are furnished with secondary sexual characteristics. These consist of scent-producing organs, brushes, and brands or pouches of specialised scales. These presumably meet the function of convincing the female that she is mating with a male of the correct species.

== Female ==
While the layout of internal genital ducts and openings of the female genitalia depends upon the taxonomic group that insect belongs to, the internal female reproductive system of all Lepidopterans consists of paired ovaries and accessory glands which produce the yolks and shells of the eggs. Female insects have a system of receptacles and ducts in which sperm is received, transported and stored. The oviducts of the female join to form a common duct (called the 'oviductus communis') which leads to the vagina.

When copulation takes place, the male butterfly or moth places a capsule of sperm (referred to as 'spermatophore') in a receptacle of the female (called the 'corpus bursae'). The sperm, when released from the capsule, swims directly into or via a small tube (the 'ductus bursae') into a special seminal receptacle (the 'spermatheca'), where the sperm is stored until it is released into the vagina for fertilisation during egg laying, which may occur hours, days, or months after mating. The eggs pass through the ovipore. The ovipore may be at the end of a modified 'ovipositor' or surrounded by a pair of broad setose anal papillae.

Butterflies of the Parnassinae (Family Papilionidae) and some Acraeini (Family Nymphalidae) add a post-copulatory plug, called the sphragis, to the abdomen of the female after copulation preventing her from mating again. The females of some moths have a scent-emitting organ located at the tip of the abdomen.

== Gallery ==
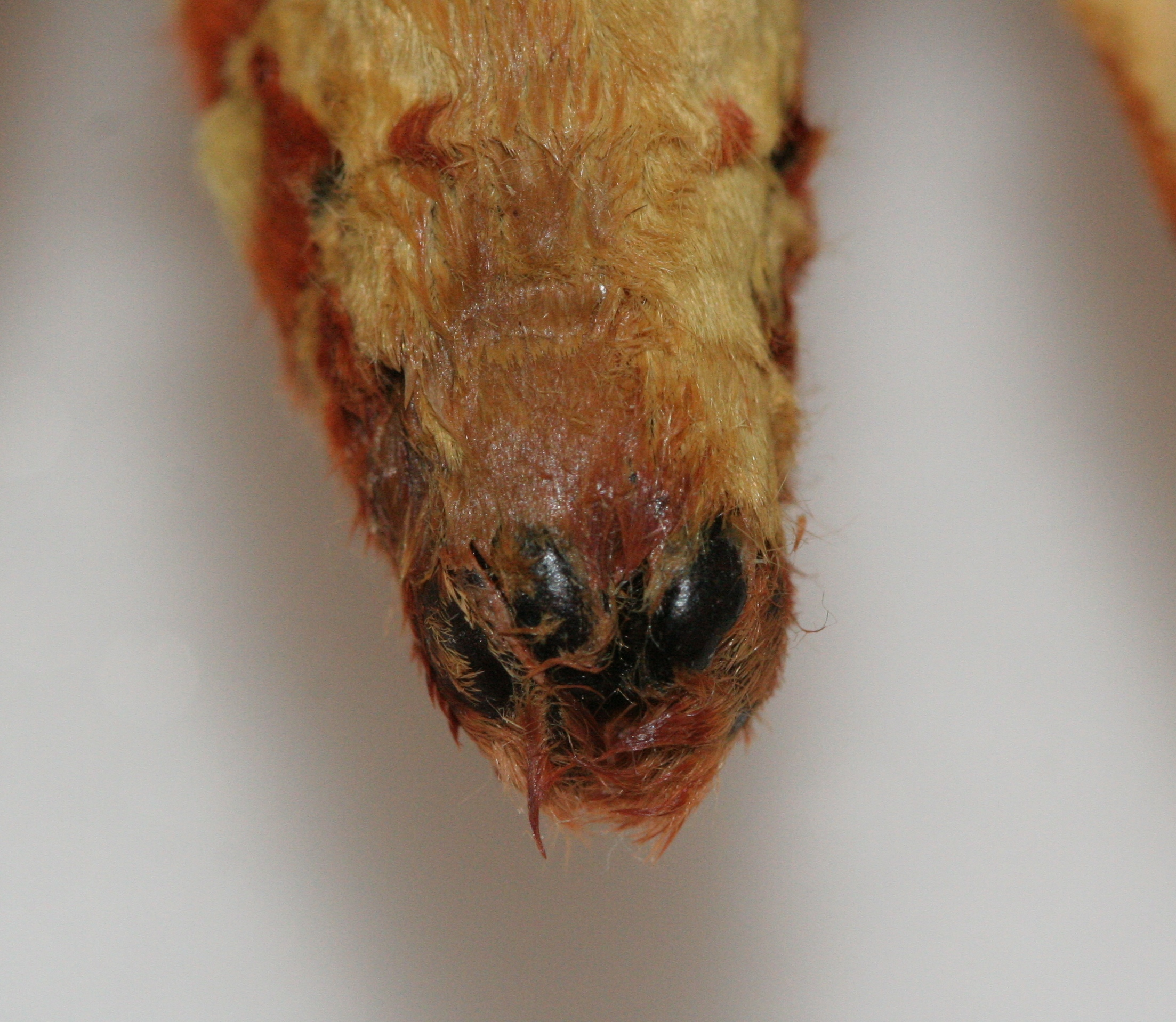
Citheronia regalis (regal moth) with claspers closed.

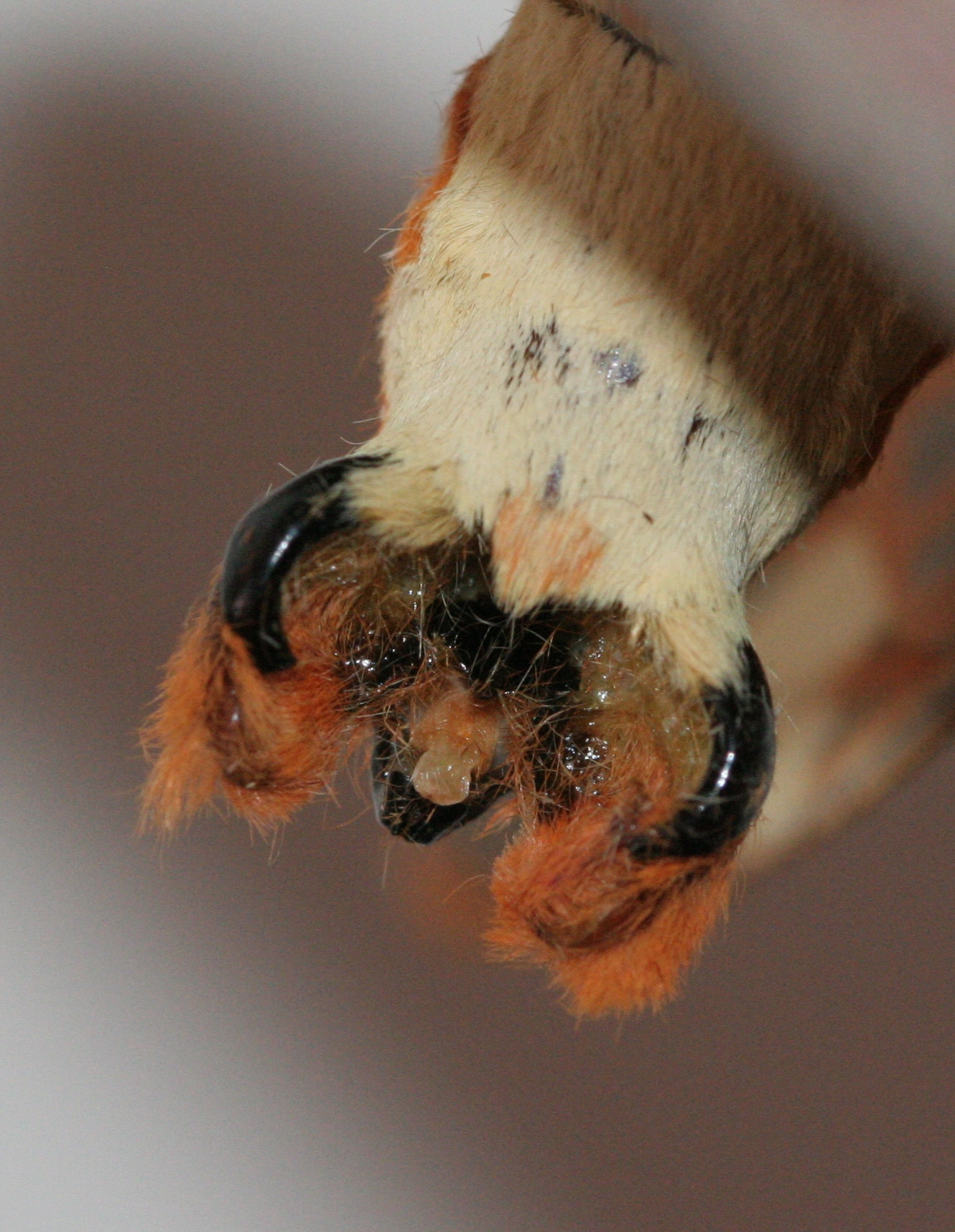
Citheronia regalis with claspers open.

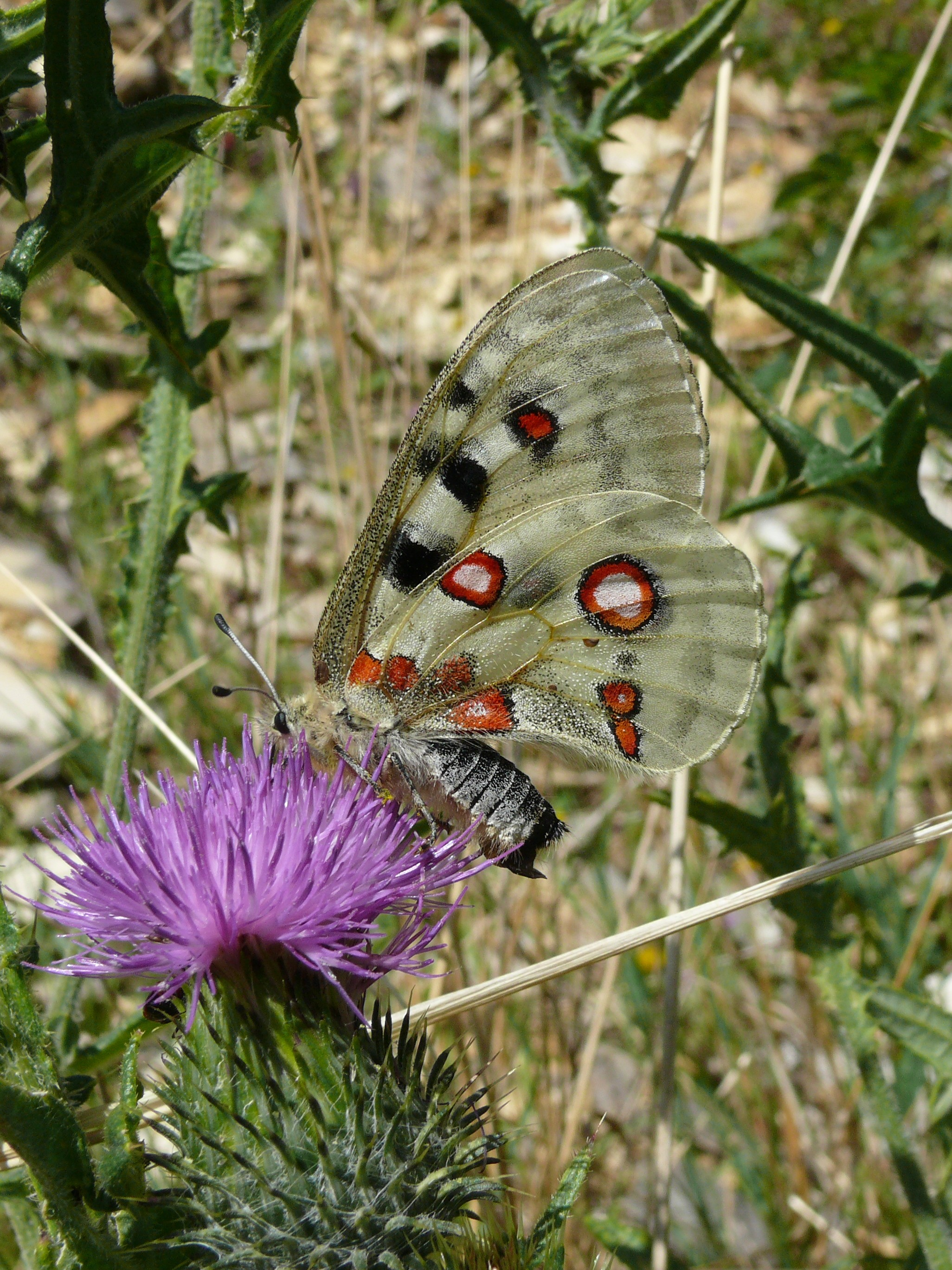
Female Parnassius (Apollo) with sphragis or mating plug.

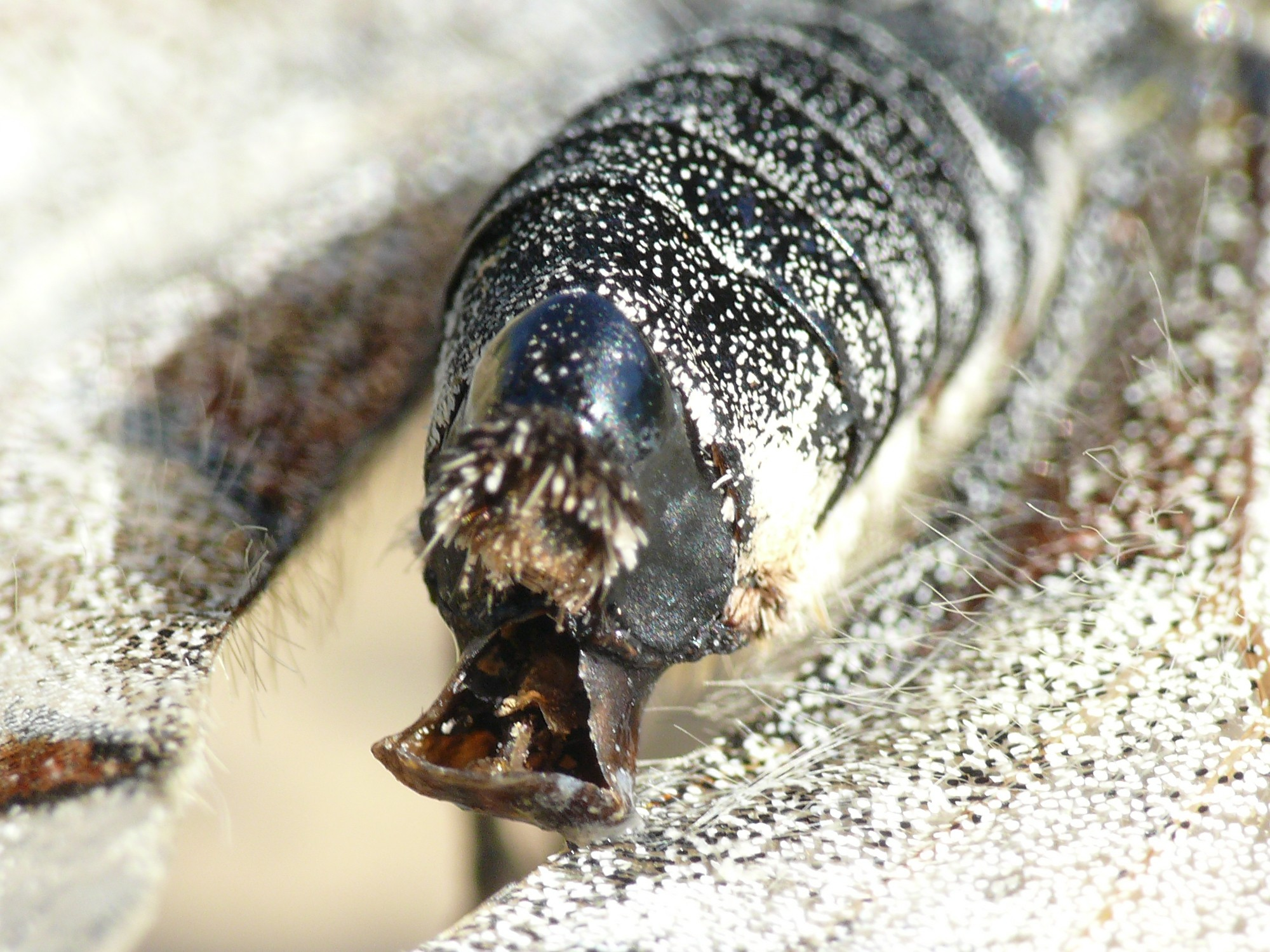
Close up of the hardened Parnassius sphragis extruding 2 to 3 mm behind the abdomen.

== See also ==
- Insect reproductive system
- External morphology of Lepidoptera
