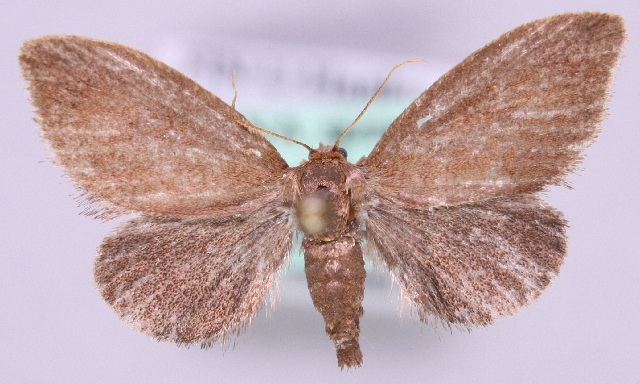

Scientific classification
- Domain: Eukaryota
- Kingdom: Animalia
- Phylum: Arthropoda
- Class: Insecta
- Order: Lepidoptera
- Family: Limacodidae
- Genus: Heterogenea
- Species: H. asella

Binomial name
- Heterogenea asella (Denis & Schiffermüller, 1775)

Synonyms
- Bombyx asella Denis & Schiffermuller, 1775

= Heterogenea asella =

Species of moth

The triangle (Heterogenea asella) is a species of moth of the family Limacodidae. It is found in most of the Palearctic realm. The wingspan is 15–20 mm. Adults are on wing from the end of May to mid July in one generation per year.

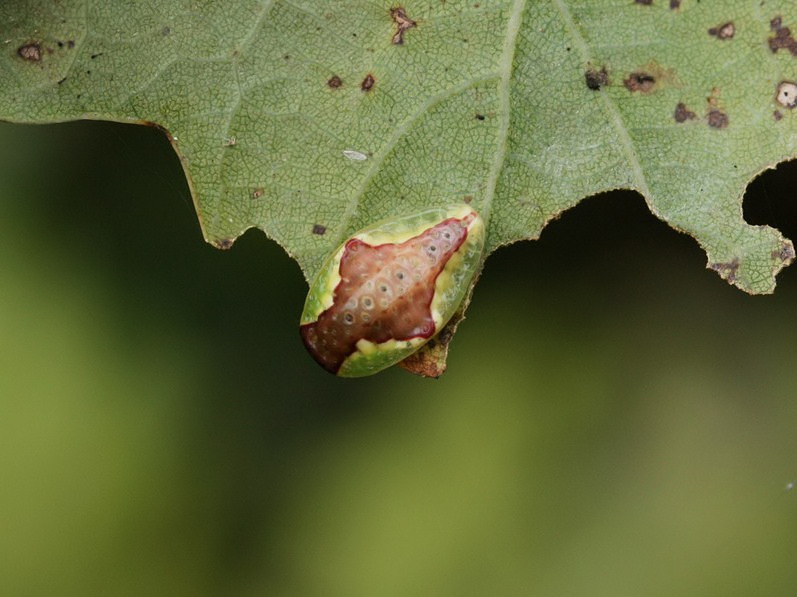
Larva

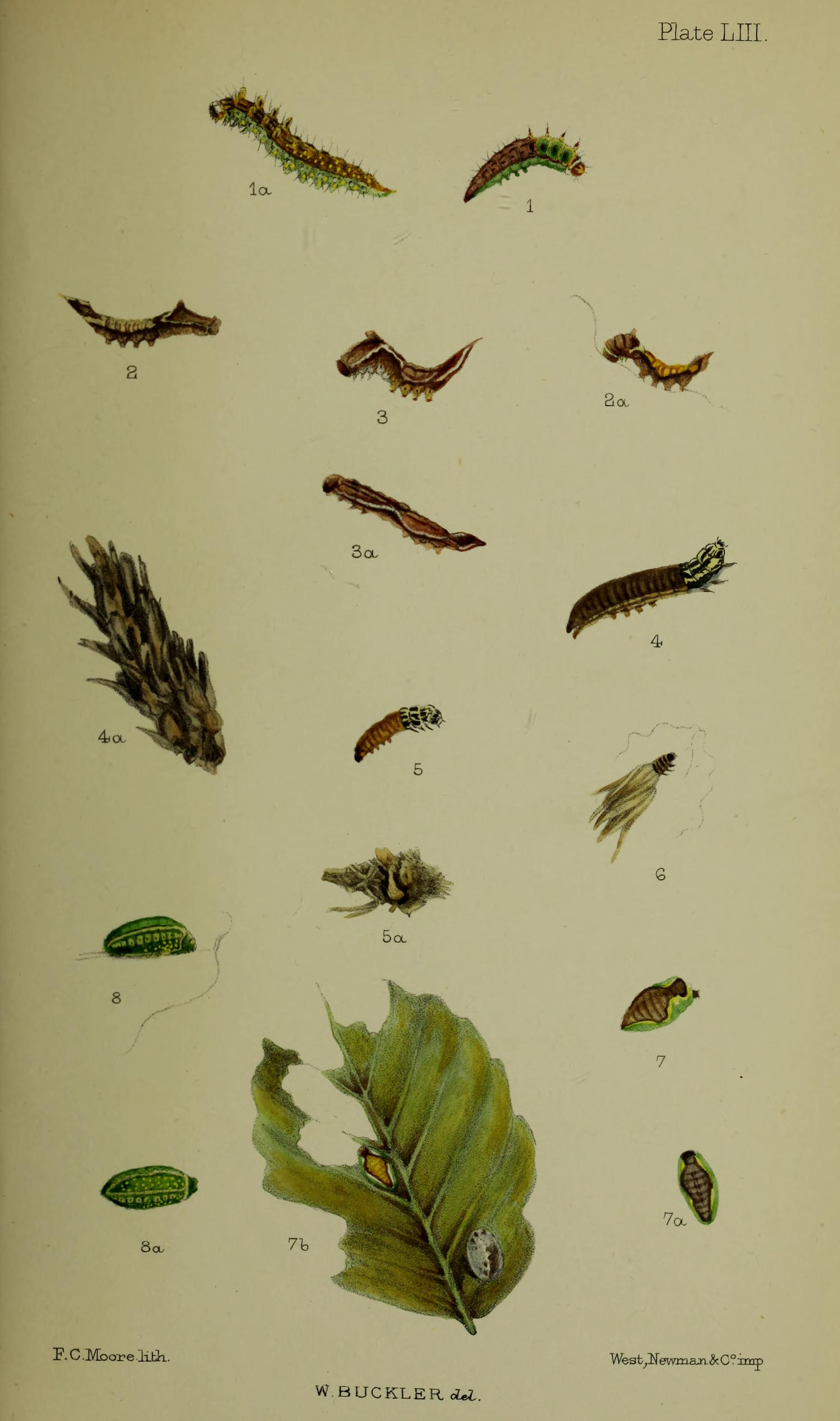
Figs. 7, 7a adult larva slightly magnified 7b adult larva natural sixe on beech leaf also the cocoon

The larvae feed on Acer, Corylus, Fagus and Quercus species.
