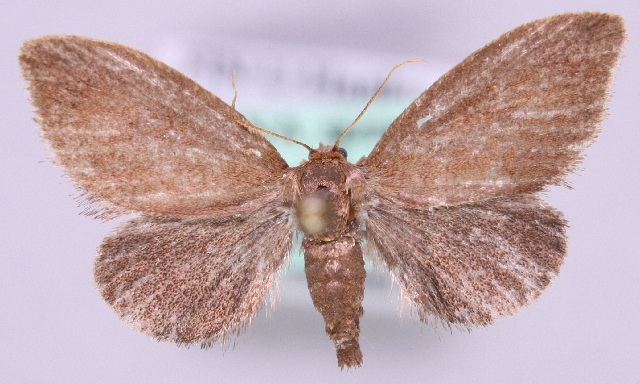
- Heterogenea asella

Scientific classification
- Domain: Eukaryota
- Kingdom: Animalia
- Phylum: Arthropoda
- Class: Insecta
- Order: Lepidoptera
- Family: Limacodidae
- Genus: Heterogenea; Knoch, 1783

= Heterogenea =

Genus of moths

Heterogenea is a genus of moths belonging to the family Limacodidae.

The species of this genus are found in Europe, Easternmost Asia and Northern America.

Species:

- Heterogenea asella (Denis & Schiffermuller, 1775)
- Heterogenea shurtleffi Packard, 1864
