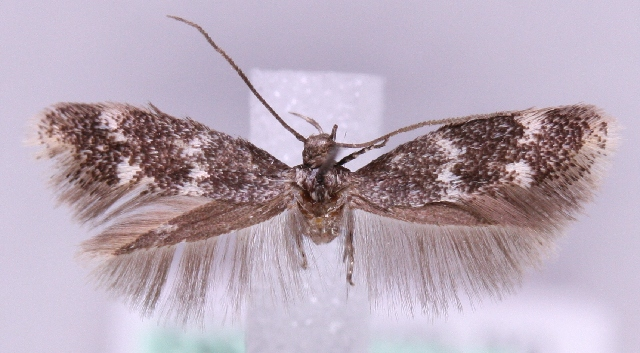

Scientific classification
- Kingdom: Animalia
- Phylum: Arthropoda
- Class: Insecta
- Order: Lepidoptera
- Family: Elachistidae
- Genus: Elachista
- Species: E. leifi

Binomial name
- Elachista leifi Kaila & Kerppola, 1992

= Elachista leifi =

Species of moth

Elachista leifi is a moth of the family Elachistidae. It is found in northern Finland.

The larvae possibly feed on Carex and/or Eriophorum vaginatum. They mine the leaves of their host plant.
