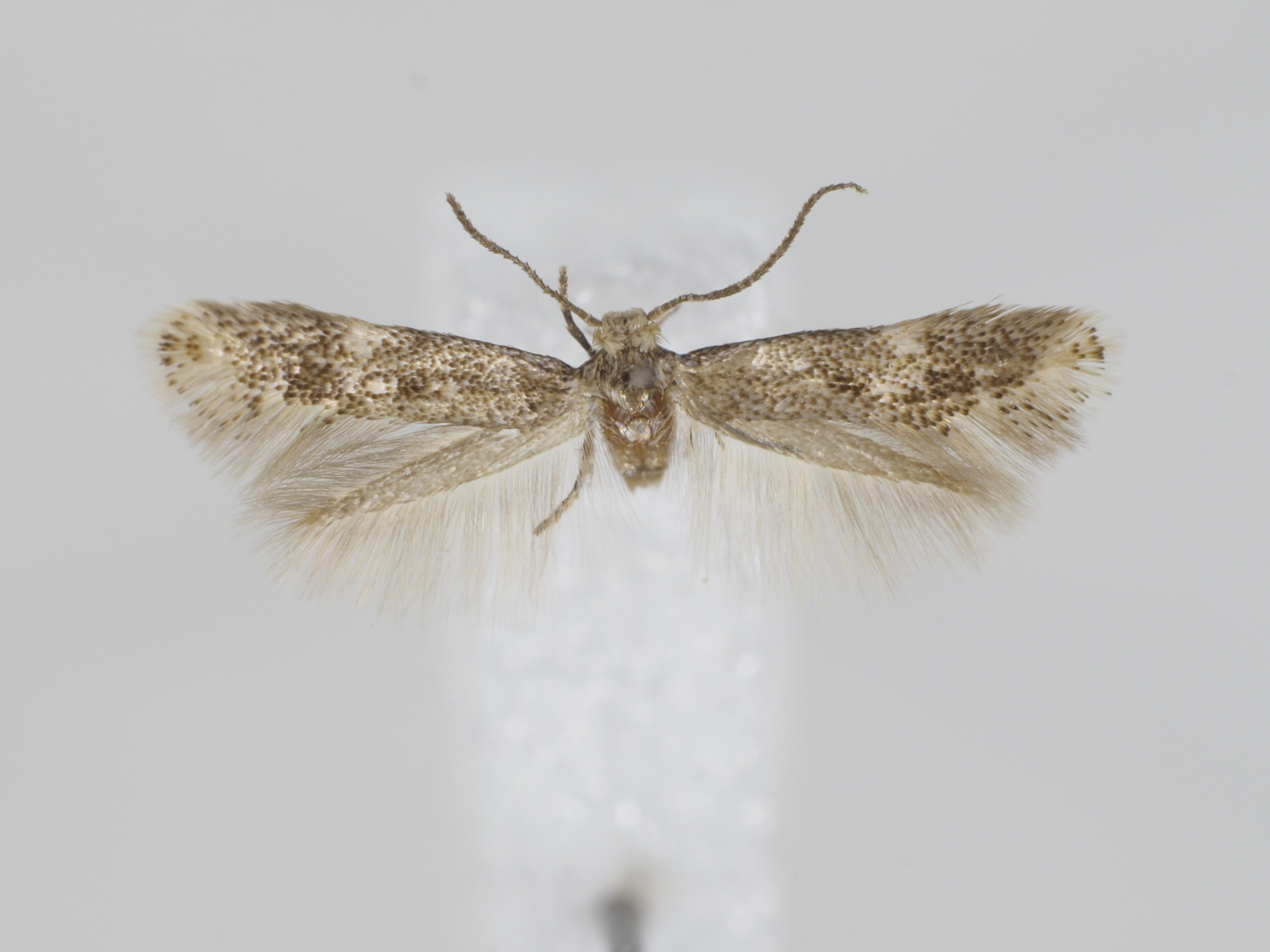

Scientific classification
- Kingdom: Animalia
- Phylum: Arthropoda
- Clade: Pancrustacea
- Class: Insecta
- Order: Lepidoptera
- Family: Elachistidae
- Genus: Elachista
- Species: E. imatrella

Binomial name
- Elachista imatrella Schantz, 1971

= Elachista imatrella =

Species of moth

Elachista imatrella is a moth of the family Elachistidae, the grass-miner moths. It is only known from Finland.

== Taxonomy ==
Elachista imatrella was first formally described in 1971 by the Finnish entomologist Max von Schanz with its type biology given as in the vicinity of Imatra in southeastern Finland. This species is closely related to Elachista cinereopunctella. This species is classified within the tetragella species complex of the genus Elachista.

== Description ==
Elachista imatrella is a small moth, the females have a forewing length of 3.4 mm while that of the male is 3.2 to 3.7 mm. These are dull coloured moths, dominated by greys and browns and similar to that of E. cinereopunctella, although it tends to be smaller. However, the most reliable method of identifying the males of this species from E. cinereopunctella is by comparing the male genitalia. The aedeagus is the principal feature to separate these species with that of E. imatrella being actually and comparatively longer in E. imatrella than in E. cinereopunctella.

== Distribution ==
Elachista imatrella is known only from a few specimens collected in Finland.

== Biology ==
Elachista imatrella is most likely restricted to boggy areas. The larvae possibly feed on Carex species, probably Carex vaginata. They mine the leaves of their host plant. The adults of this species appear to have their flight period in early summer, in June, so it is probable the caterpillars pupate in the autumn.
