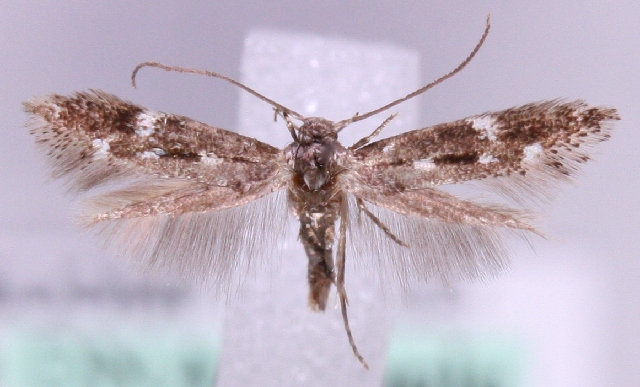

Scientific classification
- Kingdom: Animalia
- Phylum: Arthropoda
- Clade: Pancrustacea
- Class: Insecta
- Order: Lepidoptera
- Family: Elachistidae
- Genus: Elachista
- Species: E. kebneella

Binomial name
- Elachista kebneella (Traugott-Olsen & Nielsen, 1977)

Synonyms
- Biselachista kebneella Traugott-Olsen & Nielsen, 1977

= Elachista kebneella =

Species of moth

Elachista kebneella is a moth of the family Elachistidae. It is found in Sweden, Finland and northern Russia.

The wingspan is 8–9 mm. Adults have been recorded in June and July.
