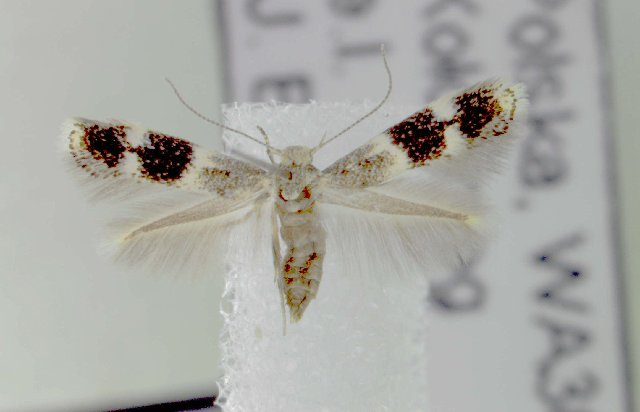

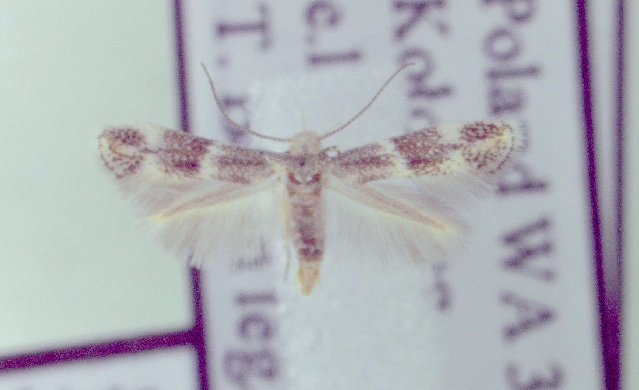

Scientific classification
- Domain: Eukaryota
- Kingdom: Animalia
- Phylum: Arthropoda
- Class: Insecta
- Order: Lepidoptera
- Family: Elachistidae
- Genus: Elachista
- Species: E. baltica

Binomial name
- Elachista baltica E. Hering, 1891

= Elachista baltica =

Species of moth

Elachista baltica is a moth of the family Elachistidae. It is found in Sweden, Finland, and Poland.

The larvae feed on Festuca rubra arenaria. They mine the leaves of their host plant.

== Taxonomy ==
The species was previously synonymised with Elachista freyerella, but was reinstated as a species by Baran & Buszko in 2005.
