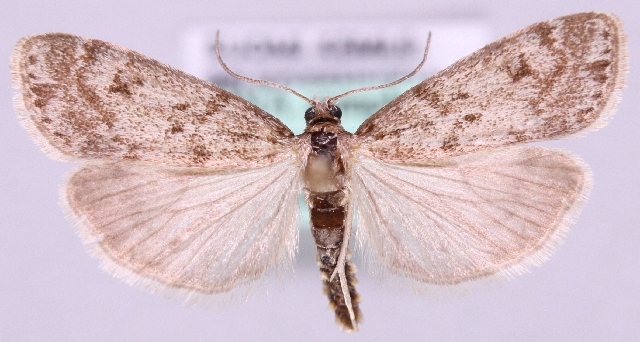

Scientific classification
- Kingdom: Animalia
- Phylum: Arthropoda
- Class: Insecta
- Order: Lepidoptera
- Family: Crambidae
- Genus: Eudonia
- Species: E. aequalis

Binomial name
- Eudonia aequalis Kyrki & Svensson, 1986

= Eudonia aequalis =

Species of moth

Eudonia aequalis is a species of moth in the family Crambidae. It is found in Sweden, Finland and Russia.

The wingspan is 19–23 mm.
