= Elachista ripula =

Scientific classification
- Kingdom: Animalia
- Phylum: Arthropoda
- Class: Insecta
- Order: Lepidoptera
- Family: Elachistidae
- Genus: Elachista
- Species: E. ripula

Binomial name
- Elachista ripula Kaila, 1998

Species of moth

Elachista ripula is a moth of the family Elachistidae that can be found in Finland and northern Russia.
