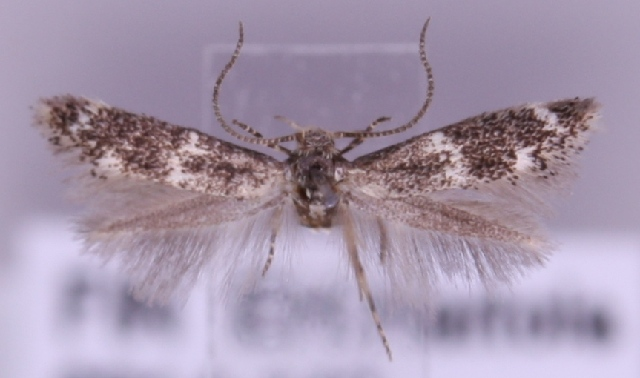

Scientific classification
- Kingdom: Animalia
- Phylum: Arthropoda
- Class: Insecta
- Order: Lepidoptera
- Family: Elachistidae
- Genus: Elachista
- Species: E. deriventa

Binomial name
- Elachista deriventa Kaila & Mutanen, 2008

= Elachista deriventa =

Species of moth

Elachista deriventa is a moth of the family Elachistidae. It is found in southern Finland and Sweden.

The wingspan is 6–8 millimetres (0.24–0.31 in). Adults are on wing in June.

The larvae feed on Calamagrostis arundinacea. They mine the leaves of their host plant. Larvae can be found from September to October. They are pale yellowish.
