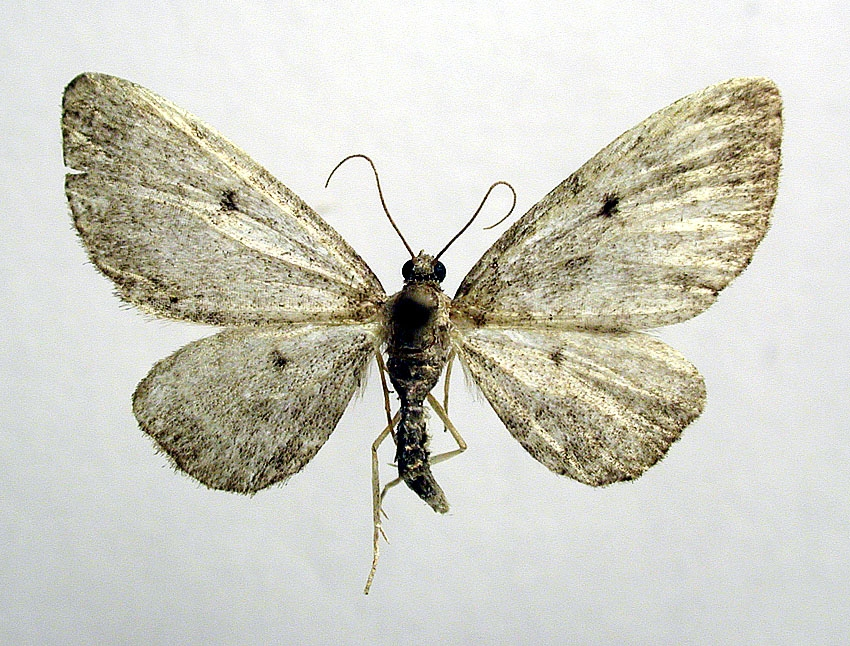

Scientific classification
- Domain: Eukaryota
- Kingdom: Animalia
- Phylum: Arthropoda
- Class: Insecta
- Order: Lepidoptera
- Family: Geometridae
- Genus: Eupithecia
- Species: E. groenblomi

Binomial name
- Eupithecia groenblomi Urbahn, 1969

Synonyms
- Eupithecia tsushimensis Inoue, 1980; Eupithecia fujisana Inoue, 1980; Eupithecia kunashiriensis Viidalepp & Mironov, 1988

= Eupithecia groenblomi =

Species of moth

Eupithecia groenblomi is a moth of the family Geometridae. It is known from Europe and Asia. In Europe, it occurs in Norway, Finland and northwestern Russia and the Urals. In Asia, it is known from the Russian Far East, the Kuril Islands, Japan and China.

The species overwinters as pupae after a larval stage from mid-August to early October. Adults fly in a single generation from late July to late August or September. Larvae are known to feed on Solidago virgaurea, the European goldenrod. In the eastern part of Eupithecia groenblomi's range, (Note: where S. virgaurea is not native) the larval host plant could be another species of Solidago.

Adults of Eupithecia groenblomi have grey fore- and hindwings that lack strong markings, and a wingspan of 14.5–24 mm. It resembles several other species in its genus, such as Eupithecia trisignaria, Eupithecia virgaureata and Eupithecia selinata.
