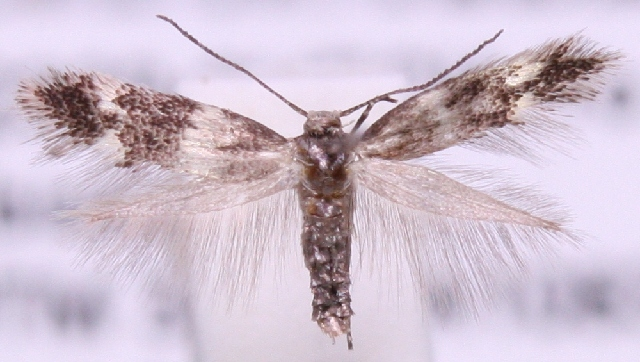

Scientific classification
- Kingdom: Animalia
- Phylum: Arthropoda
- Clade: Pancrustacea
- Class: Insecta
- Order: Lepidoptera
- Family: Elachistidae
- Genus: Elachista
- Species: E. abiskoella

Binomial name
- Elachista abiskoella Bengtsson, 1977

= Elachista abiskoella =

Species of moth

Elachista abiskoella is a moth of the family Elachistidae. It is found in Sweden and Finland.

The wingspan is 8–9 mm.
