= Elachista vonschantzi =

Scientific classification
- Domain: Eukaryota
- Kingdom: Animalia
- Phylum: Arthropoda
- Class: Insecta
- Order: Lepidoptera
- Family: Elachistidae
- Genus: Elachista
- Species: E. vonschantzi

Binomial name
- Elachista vonschantzi Svensson, 1976

Species of moth

Elachista vonschantzi is a moth of the family Elachistidae that is found along the coast of the Gulf of Bothnia.

The wingspan is 8–10 millimetres (0.31–0.39 in). Adults are on wing from June to July.

The larvae feed on Calamagrostis stricta. They mine the leaves of their host plant.
