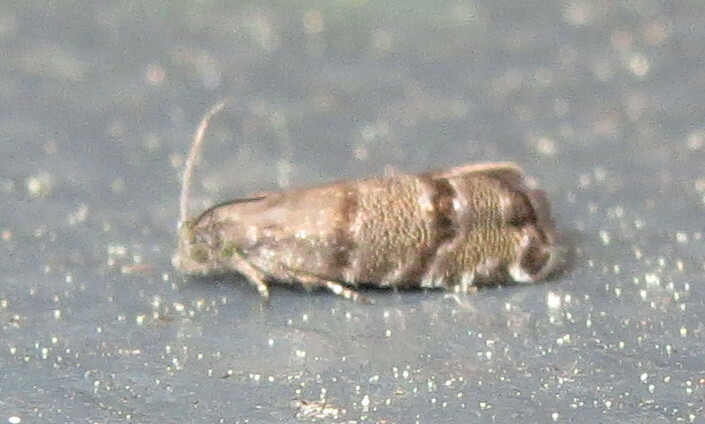

Scientific classification
- Kingdom: Animalia
- Phylum: Arthropoda
- Clade: Pancrustacea
- Class: Insecta
- Order: Lepidoptera
- Family: Tortricidae
- Genus: Pammene
- Species: P. ochsenheimeriana

Binomial name
- Pammene ochsenheimeriana (Lienig & Zeller, 1846)

= Pammene ochsenheimeriana =

Species of moth

Pammene ochsenheimeriana is a moth belonging to the family Tortricidae. The species was first described by Friederike Lienig and Philipp Christoph Zeller in 1846.

It is native to Europe and across the Palearctic.

The wingspan is 8–9 mm. The face and palpi are dark fuscous, whitish-sprinkled. The forewings are dark fuscous, somewhat sprinkled finely with grey-whitish. The costa is posteriorly strigulated with silvery-white. The edge of the basal patch and a narrow angulated central fascia are darker, edged with silvery-metallic. There are some silvery metallic marks towards apex and termen. The hindwings are fuscous.

They fly in May and June. The larvae feed on Picea abies, Abies alba, and Pinus sylvestris, eating the top shoots.
