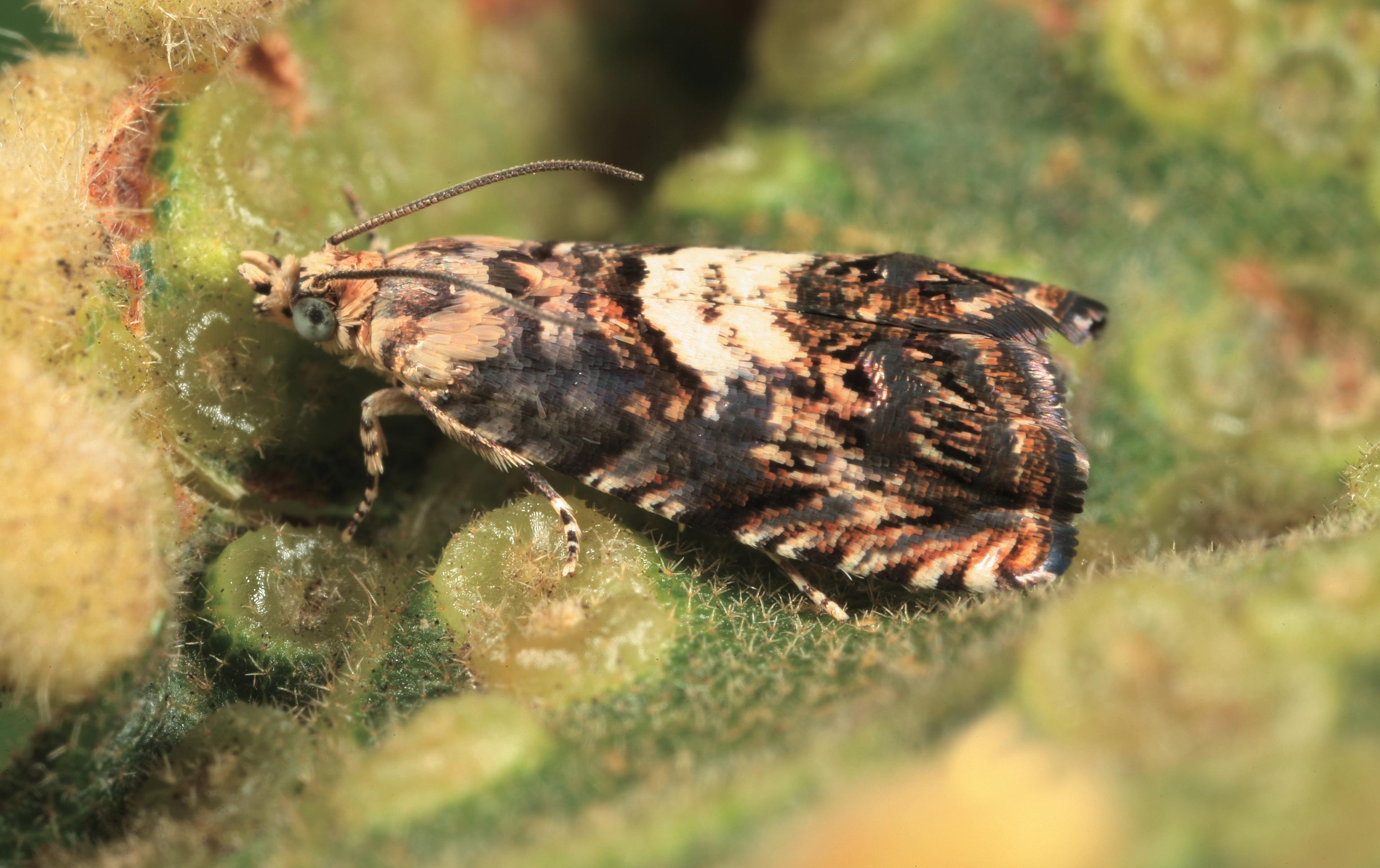

Scientific classification
- Kingdom: Animalia
- Phylum: Arthropoda
- Clade: Pancrustacea
- Class: Insecta
- Order: Lepidoptera
- Family: Tortricidae
- Genus: Pammene
- Species: P. gallicolana

Binomial name
- Pammene gallicolana (Lienig & Zeller, 1846)

Synonyms
- Grapholitha gallicolana Lienig & Zeller, 1846; Pammene gailicolana Kennel, 1921; Pammene macrolepis Diakonoff, 1976

= Pammene gallicolana =

Species of moth

Pammene gallicolana is a species of moth of the family Tortricidae. It is found in northern Russia and Latvia and from Germany to Italy and Greece.

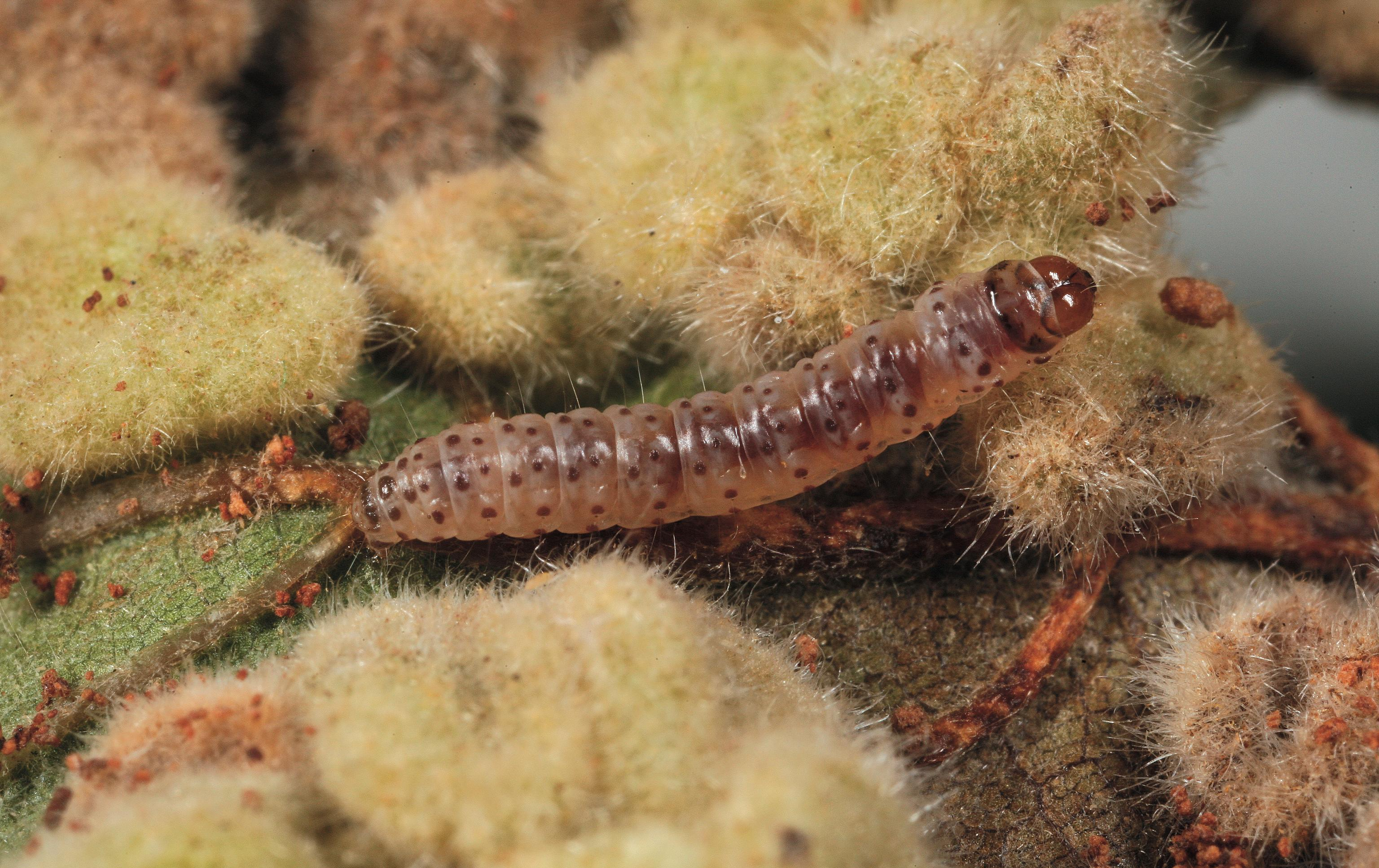
Larva

The wingspan is 11–14 mm. Adults are on wing at the end of July.

The larvae live as an inquiline in wasp galls on Quercus species.

== Taxonomy ==
Pammene macrolepis (described from Rhodes in Greece) is mostly treated as a synonym of Pammene gallicolana, although some authors treat it as a valid species. It may also prove to be a subspecies.
