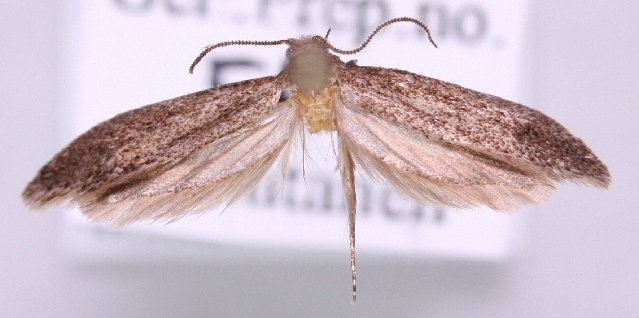

Scientific classification
- Kingdom: Animalia
- Phylum: Arthropoda
- Clade: Pancrustacea
- Class: Insecta
- Order: Lepidoptera
- Family: Tineidae
- Genus: Elatobia
- Species: E. fuliginosella

Binomial name
- Elatobia fuliginosella (Lienig & Zeller, 1846)

Synonyms
- Tinea fuliginosella Zeller, 1846; Tineomima kenteella Staudinger, 1892; Tinea severella Christoph, 1888

= Elatobia fuliginosella =

Species of moth

Elatobia fuliginosella is a moth of the family Tineidae. It was described by Friederike Lienig and Philipp Christoph Zeller in 1846. It is found in almost all of Europe, except Ireland, Great Britain, Portugal, the Benelux, Denmark and parts of the Balkan Peninsula, eastwards up to European Russia; in North Africa known from Morocco and Tunisia, eastwards through Siberia up to Mongolia.

The wingspan is 13–19 mm. Adults have been recorded on wing from June to August.

The larvae feed on insect remains.
