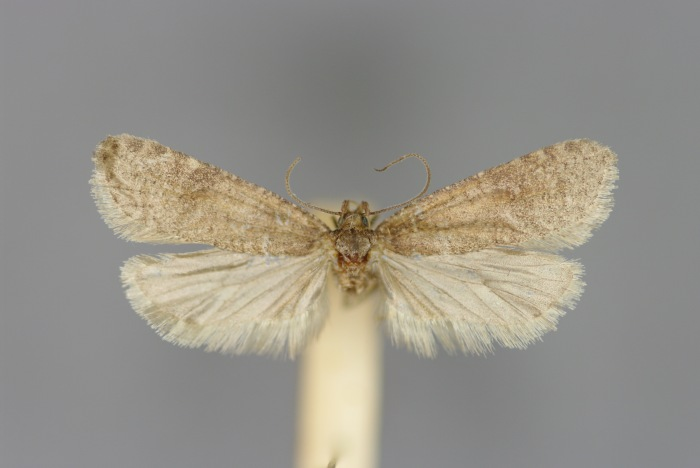

Scientific classification
- Kingdom: Animalia
- Phylum: Arthropoda
- Clade: Pancrustacea
- Class: Insecta
- Order: Lepidoptera
- Family: Depressariidae
- Genus: Levipalpus
- Species: L. hepatariella

Binomial name
- Levipalpus hepatariella (Lienig & Zeller, 1846)

Synonyms
- Depressaria hepatariella Lienig & Zeller, 1846

= Levipalpus hepatariella =

Species of moth

Levipalpus hepatariella is a species of moth of the family Depressariidae. It is found in most of Europe, except Ireland, Belgium, the Iberian Peninsula, Ukraine and most of the Balkan Peninsula. In the east its range extends to the eastern part of the Palearctic realm.

The wingspan is 20–25 mm. Adults have been recorded from August to the beginning of September.

The larvae feed on Arenaria species and Antennaria dioica.
