= Udea inquinatalis =

Scientific classification
- Kingdom: Animalia
- Phylum: Arthropoda
- Class: Insecta
- Order: Lepidoptera
- Family: Crambidae
- Genus: Udea
- Species: U. inquinatalis

Binomial name
- Udea inquinatalis (Lienig & Zeller, 1846)

Synonyms
- Scopula inquinatalis Lienig & Zeller, 1846; Pionea albinalis Della Beffa, 1942; Udea glacialis Packard, 1867

Species of moth

Udea inquinatalis is a species of moth in the family Crambidae. The species was first described by Friederike Lienig and Philipp Christoph Zeller in 1846. It is found in most of Europe (except Ireland, Great Britain, the Benelux, the Iberian Peninsula and most of the Balkan Peninsula) and North America (including Quebec, Manitoba, Michigan and Minnesota).

The wingspan is 18–25 mm.

The larvae feed on downy birch (Betula pubescens), dwarf birch (Betula nana), willow (Salix species), European blueberry (Vaccinium myrtillus) and meadowsweet (Filipendula ulmaria).
