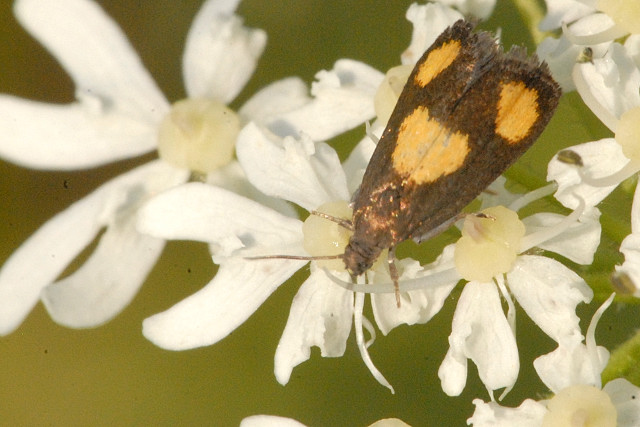
- Adult Pammene aurana at Commanster in the Belgian Ardennes

Scientific classification
- Domain: Eukaryota
- Kingdom: Animalia
- Phylum: Arthropoda
- Class: Insecta
- Order: Lepidoptera
- Family: Tortricidae
- Tribe: Grapholitini
- Genus: Pammene; Hübner, [1825]

Type species
- Tortrix trauniana Denis & Schiffermüller, 1775

Diversity
- 89 species

Synonyms
- Numerous, see text

= Pammene =

Genus of tortrix moths

The tortrix moth, genus Pammene, belongs to the tribe Grapholitini of the subfamily Olethreutinae.

== Species ==
89 species are currently recognized in Pammene:

- Pammene aceris Kuznetzov in Danilevsky & Kuznetsov, 1968
- Pammene adusta Kuznetzov 1972
- Pammene agnotana Rebel, 1914
- Pammene ainorum Kuznetzov in Danilevsky & Kuznetsov, 1968
- Pammene albuginana (Guenée, 1845)
- Pammene amygdalana (Duponchel in Godart, 1842)
- Pammene argyrana (Hübner, [1799])
- Pammene aurana (Fabricius, 1775)
- Pammene aurita Razowski, 1992
- Pammene avetianae Kuznetzov, 1964
- Pammene bathysema Diakonoff, 1976
- Pammene blanda Bae & Park, 1998
- Pammene blockiana (Herrich-Schäffer, 1851)
- Pammene bowmanana (McDunnough, 1927)
- Pammene caeruleata Kuznetzov, 1970
- Pammene caliginosa Kuznetzov, 1972
- Pammene christophana (Moschler, 1862)
- Pammene clanculana (Tengström, 1869)
- Pammene cocciferana Walsingham, 1903
- Pammene crataegicola Liu & Komai, 1993
- Pammene crataegophila Amsel, 1935
- Pammene cyanatra (Diakonoff, 1976)
- Pammene cytisana (Zeller, 1847)
- Pammene engadinensis Müller-Rutz, 1920
- Pammene epanthista (Meyrick, 1922)
- Pammene exscribana Kuznetzov, 1986
- Pammene fasciana (Linnaeus, 1761) – chestnut leafroller
- Pammene felicitana Heinrich, 1923
- Pammene festiva Kuznetzov, 1972
- Pammene flavicellula Kuznetzov, 1971
- Pammene fulminea (Komai, 1999)
- Pammene gallicana (Guenée, 1845)
- Pammene gallicolana (Lienig & Zeller, 1846)
- Pammene germmana (Hübner, [1799])
- Pammene giganteana (Peyerimhoff, 1863)
- Pammene ginkgoicola Liu, 1992
- Pammene griseana Walsingham, 1900
- Pammene griseomaculana Kuznetzov, 1960
- Pammene grunini (Kuznetzov, 1960)
- Pammene ignorata Kuznetzov, in Danilevsky & Kuznetsov, 1968
- Pammene insolentana Kuznetzov, 1964
- Pammene instructana Kuznetzov, 1964
- Pammene insulana (Guenée, 1845)
- Pammene japonica Kuznetzov in Danilevsky & Kuznetsov, 1968
- Pammene juniperana (Millière, 1858)
- Pammene laserpitiana Huemer & Erlebach, 1999
- Pammene leucitis (Meyrick, 1907)
- Pammene luculentana Kuznetzov in Danilevsky, Kuznetsov & Falkovitsh, 1962
- Pammene luedersiana (Sorhagen, 1885)
- Pammene macrolepis Diakonoff, 1976
- Pammene mariana (Zerny, 1920)
- Pammene medioalbana Knudson, 1986
- Pammene megalocephala Diakonoff, 1983
- Pammene monotincta Kuznetzov, 1976
- Pammene nannodes Walsingham, 1900
- Pammene nemorosa Kuznetzov in Danilevsky & Kuznetsov, 1968
- Pammene nequior Kuznetzov, 1964
- Pammene nescia Kuznetzov, 1972
- Pammene nigritana (Mann, 1862)
- Pammene obscurana (Stephens, 1834)
- Pammene ochsenheimeriana (Lienig & Zeller, 1846)
- Pammene ocliferia (Heinrich, 1926)
- Pammene oreina Kuznetzov, 1973
- Pammene orientana Kuznetzov, 1960
- Pammene ornata Walsingham, 1903
- Pammene oxycedrana (Millière, 1876)
- Pammene paula (Heinrich, 1926)
- Pammene percognata Diakonoff, 1976
- Pammene perstructana (Walker, 1863)
- Pammene phthoneris Diakonoff, 1976
- Pammene piceae Komai, 1999
- Pammene populana (Fabricius, 1787)
- Pammene pulchella Amsel, 1935
- Pammene pullana Kuznetzov, 1986
- Pammene purpureana (Constant, 1888)
- Pammene querceti (Gozmány, 1957)
- Pammene regiana (Zeller, 1849)
- Pammene rhediella (Clerck, 1759)
- Pammene salvana (Staudinger, 1859)
- Pammene shicotanica Kuznetzov in Danilevsky & Kuznetsov, 1968
- Pammene soyoensis Bae & Park, 1998
- Pammene spiniana (Duponchel in Godart, 1842)
- Pammene splendidulana (Guenée, 1845)
- Pammene subsalvana Kuznetzov, 1960
- Pammene suspectana (Lienig & Zeller, 1846)
- Pammene tauriana Kuznetzov, 1960
- Pammene trauniana (Denis & Schiffermüller, 1775)
- Pammene tricuneana (Kennel, 1900)
- Pammene tsugae Issiki in Issiki & Mutuura, 1961

== Synonyms ==
Obsolete scientific names (junior synonyms and others) of Pammene are:

- Encelis (lapsus)
- Eucelis Hübner, [1825]
- Encells (lapsus)
- Halonota Stephens, 1852
- Hemene (lapsus)
- Hemerosia Stephens, 1852
- Hemimene Hübner, 1825
- Heusimene Stephens, 1834
- Metasphaeroeca Fernald, 1908
- Orchemia Guenée, 1845
- Palla Billberg, 1820 (non Hübner, 1819: preoccupied)
- Pamene (lapsus)
- Pammena (lapsus)
- Phthoroblastis Lederer, 1859
- Psudotomia Stephens, 1829
- Pyrodes Guenée, 1845 (non Audinet-Serville, 1832: preoccupied)
- Sphaeroeca Meyrick, 1895 (non Lauterborn, 1894: preoccupied)
- Trycheris Guenée, 1845

The synonymy of Pammene has been subject to some confusion with its close relatives Cydia and Epinotia: Eucelis, Orchemia and Trycheris are sometimes listed as junior synonyms of the former, and Halonota has been listed as synonym of the latter. But the type species of Eucelis and Trycheris is Tortrix mediana (a junior synonym of P. aurana), that of Orchemia is O. gallicana (a junior synonym of P. gallicana), and that of Halonota is Pyralis populana (a junior synonym of P. populana). Thus, Eucelis, Halonota, Orchemia and Trycheris are all junior subjective synonym of the present genus.
