= Ortholepis vacciniella =

Scientific classification
- Kingdom: Animalia
- Phylum: Arthropoda
- Class: Insecta
- Order: Lepidoptera
- Family: Pyralidae
- Genus: Ortholepis
- Species: O. vacciniella

Binomial name
- Ortholepis vacciniella (Lienig & Zeller, 1847)

Synonyms
- Epischnia vacciniella Lienig & Zeller, 1847

Species of moth

Ortholepis vacciniella is a species of snout moth described by Friederike Lienig and Philipp Christoph Zeller in 1847. It is found in Germany, Denmark, Poland, the Baltic region, Russia and Fennoscandia.

The wingspan is 12–18 mm.

The larvae feed on Vaccinium and dwarf birch (Betula nana).
