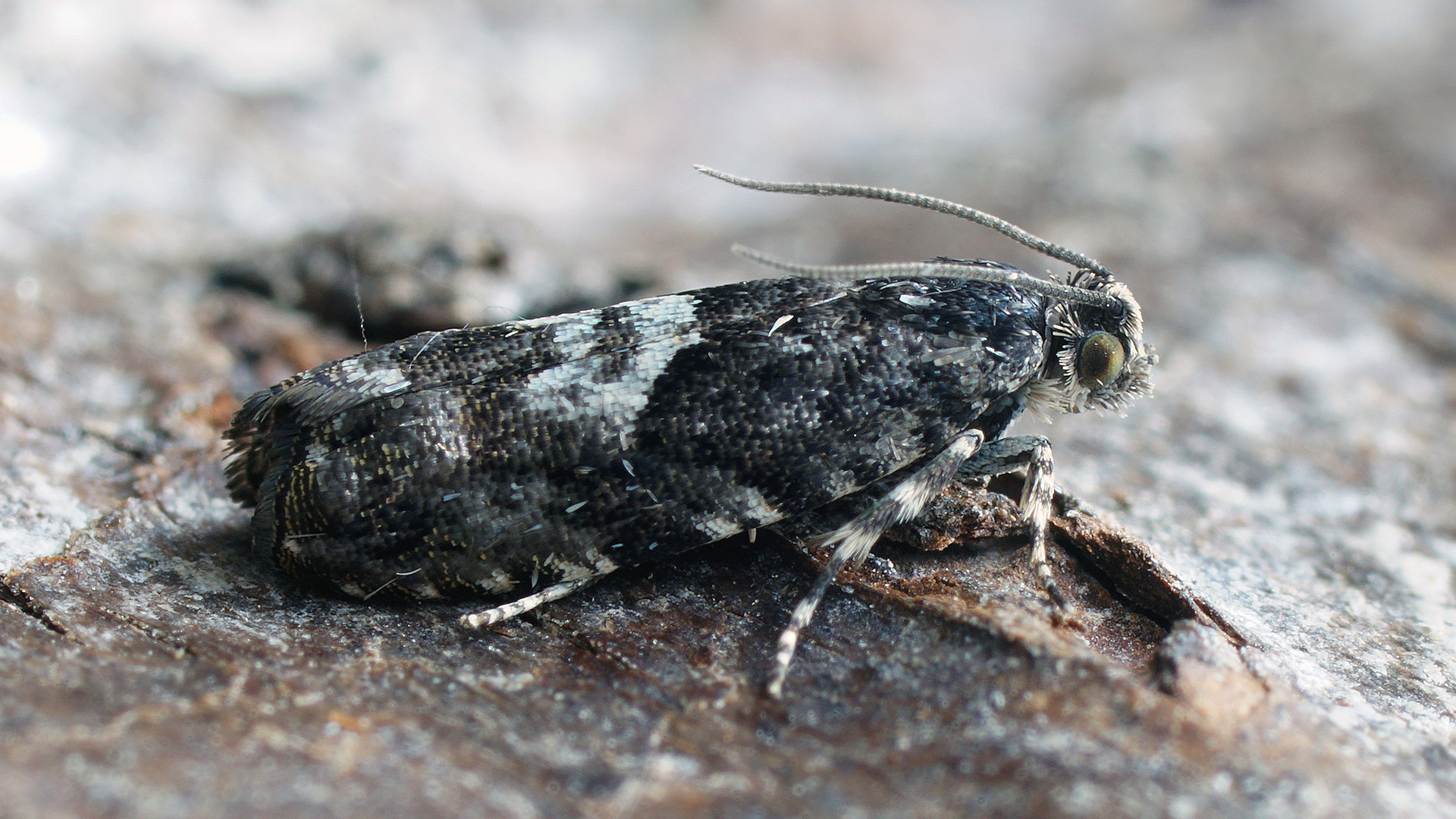
- Pammene argyrana Moscow Oblast

Scientific classification
- Kingdom: Animalia
- Phylum: Arthropoda
- Clade: Pancrustacea
- Class: Insecta
- Order: Lepidoptera
- Family: Tortricidae
- Genus: Pammene
- Species: P. argyrana

Binomial name
- Pammene argyrana (Hübner, 1799)

= Pammene argyrana =

Species of moth

Pammene argyrana is a species of moth belonging to the family Tortricidae.

It is native to Europe.

The wingspan is 10–13 mm. The forewing has a white or brownish-white spot at the dorsal edge. The colour of the hindwings is characteristic: brownish white with sharply delineated brown areas in the posterior part and at the apex. Meyrick describes it - The forewings are fuscous, sometimes ochreous- tinged, irregularly marked with black, costa strigulated with black and white; three streaks from costa and margins of ocellus leaden - metallic; sharply angulated edge of basal patch and central fascia darker, separated by a somewhat pentagonal white dorsal blotch more or less strigulated with blackish; a suffused blackish spot before apex. Hindwings fuscous, in male basally whitish, with terminal and broader dorsal blackish fascia, in female posteriorly darker fuscous. The larva is pinkish-white, sharply ringed with white; spots red; head brown; plate of 2 whitish or grey, posterior edge blackish

Like Pammene giganteana, this species has larvae that develop in galls made by Cynipidae on Quercus. The adults fly in April–May, mostly at night, they often rest in a bark crack during the day.
