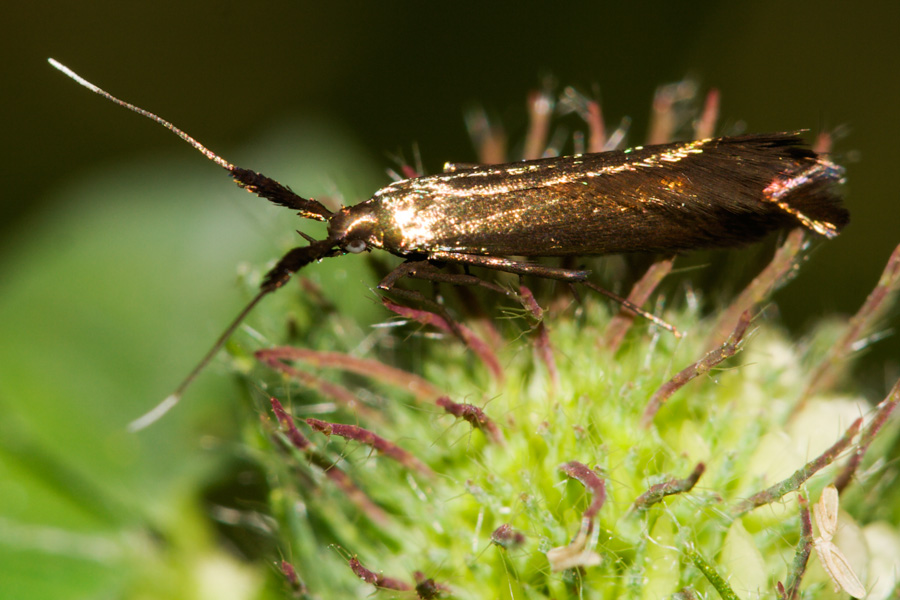

Scientific classification
- Kingdom: Animalia
- Phylum: Arthropoda
- Class: Insecta
- Order: Lepidoptera
- Family: Coleophoridae
- Genus: Coleophora
- Species: C. deauratella

Binomial name
- Coleophora deauratella Lienig & Zeller, 1846

Synonyms
- Damophila deauratella (Lienig & Zeller, 1846)

= Coleophora deauratella =

Species of moth

Coleophora deauratella is a moth of the family Coleophoridae. It is found in most of Europe, Asia Minor, Tasmania, North America and New Zealand.

== Description ==
The wingspan is 11–13 mm. Head metallic bronze. Antennae dark grey, apex white, towards base thickened with dense dark coppery-bronzy scales [Antenna thickened with projecting scales at base to beyond the first three segments]. Forewings shining brassy bronze, towards apex coppery-tinged. Hindwings dark grey.

Adults are on wing from June to July.

The larvae feed on red clover (Trifolium pratense).

== Distribution ==
It is found in most of Europe, as well as Asia Minor, Lebanon and Tasmania. It is an introduced species in North America and New Zealand.
