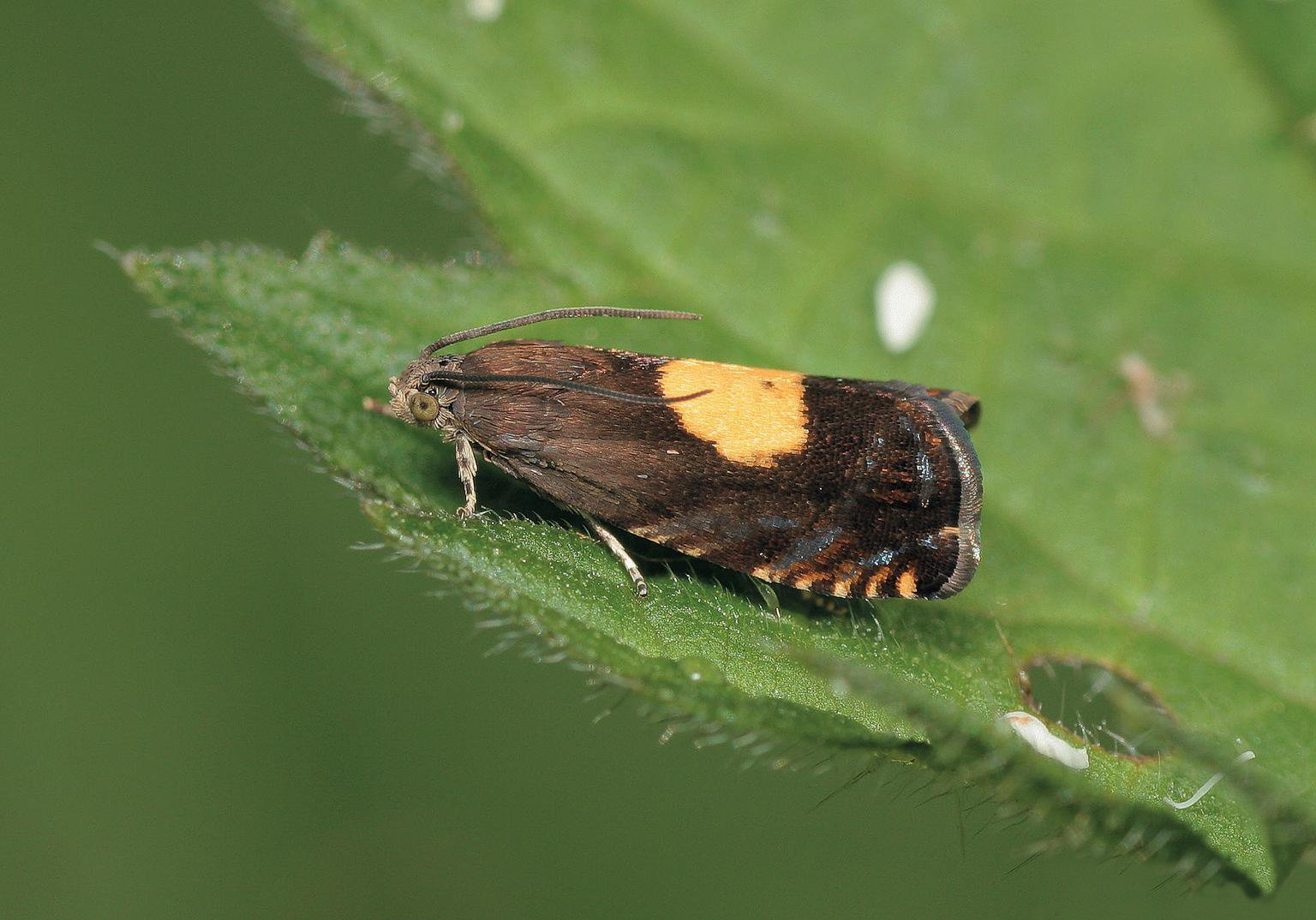

Scientific classification
- Kingdom: Animalia
- Phylum: Arthropoda
- Class: Insecta
- Order: Lepidoptera
- Family: Tortricidae
- Genus: Pammene
- Species: P. regiana

Binomial name
- Pammene regiana (Zeller, 1849)

Synonyms
- Grapholitha regiana Zeller, 1849; Pammene regiana caucasica Kuznetzov, in Danilevsky & Kuznetsov, 1968

= Pammene regiana =

Species of moth

Pammene regiana is a species of moth of the family Tortricidae. It was described by Zeller in 1849. It is found in most of Europe, except the Iberian Peninsula, most of the Balkan Peninsula, Lithuania and Ukraine.

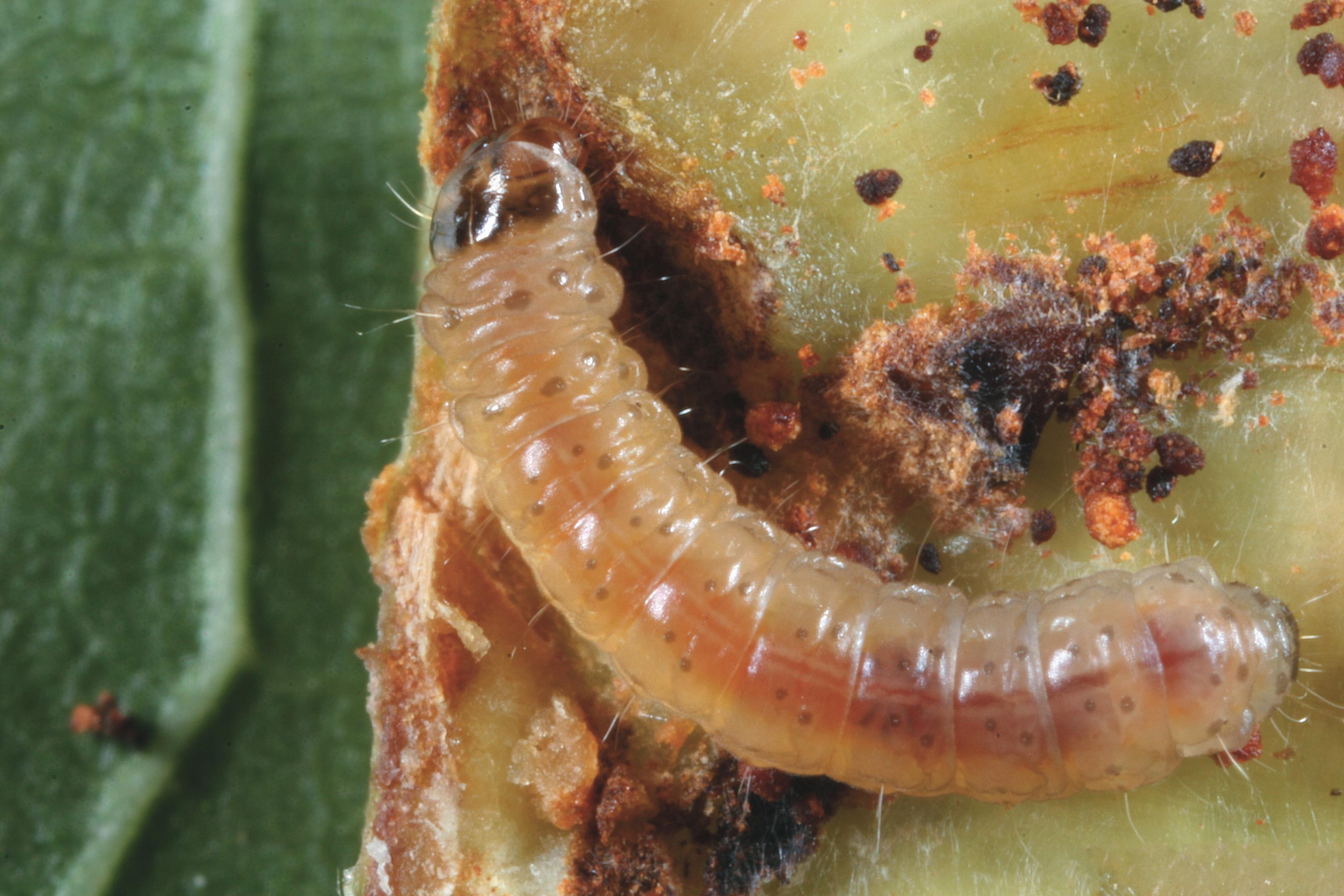
Larva

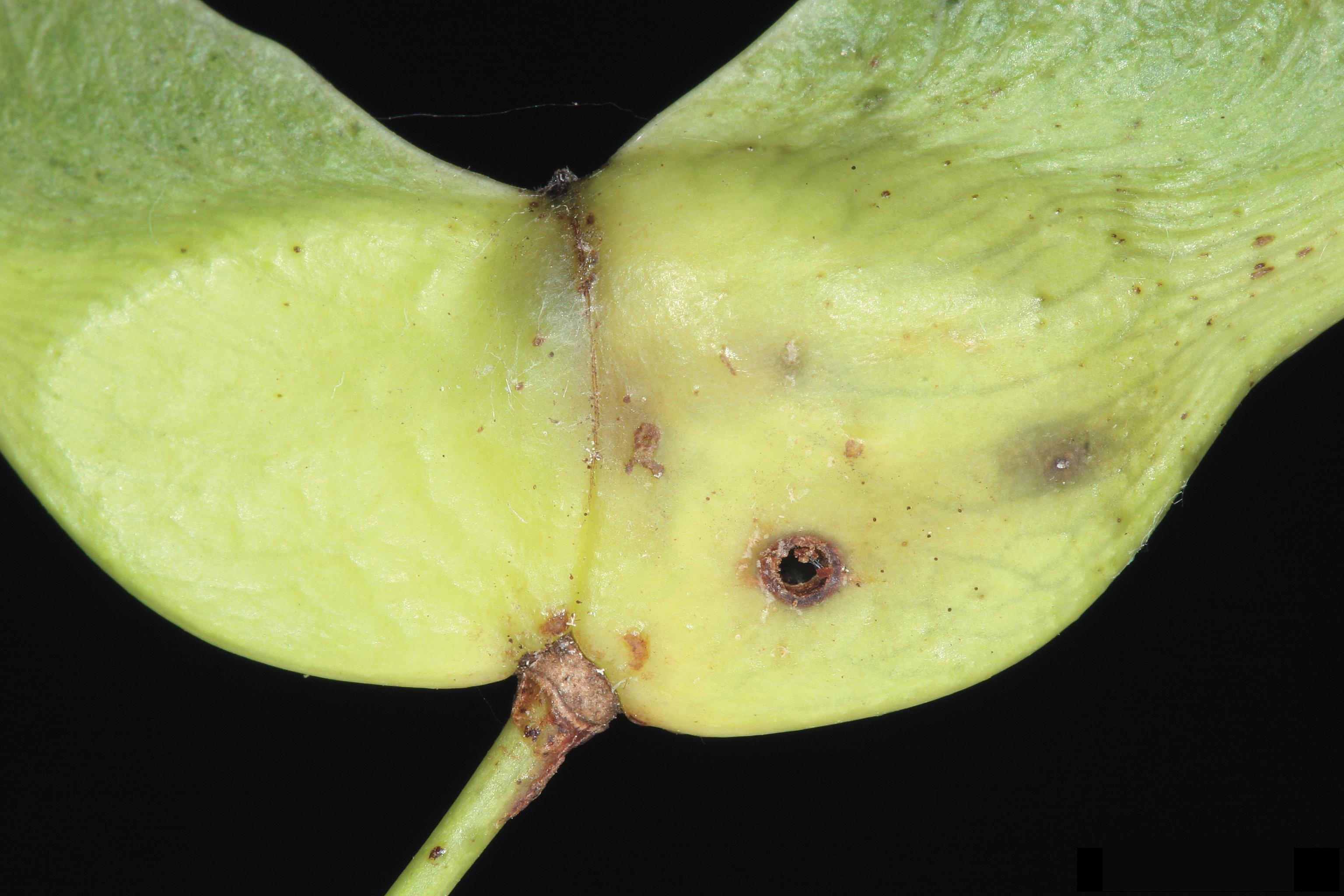
Damage

The wingspan is about 13–16 millimetres (0.51–0.63 in). The forewings are dark fuscous. The posterior of the costa has whitish strigulae yellower beneath. There is a rather large yellow pentagonal median dorsal blotch, not nearly reaching the tornus and sometimes with a few dark fuscous scales. A streak from costa beyond the middle and the margins of ocellus are bluish metallic. The hindwings are dark fuscous, in male with blackish suffusion on 1c towards termen. The larva is whitish; head brown; plate of 2 pale ochreous.

Adults are on wing from May to July.

The larvae feed on Acer pseudoplatanus. They feed inside the seeds of their host plant. Pupation takes place in a crevice of the bark.
