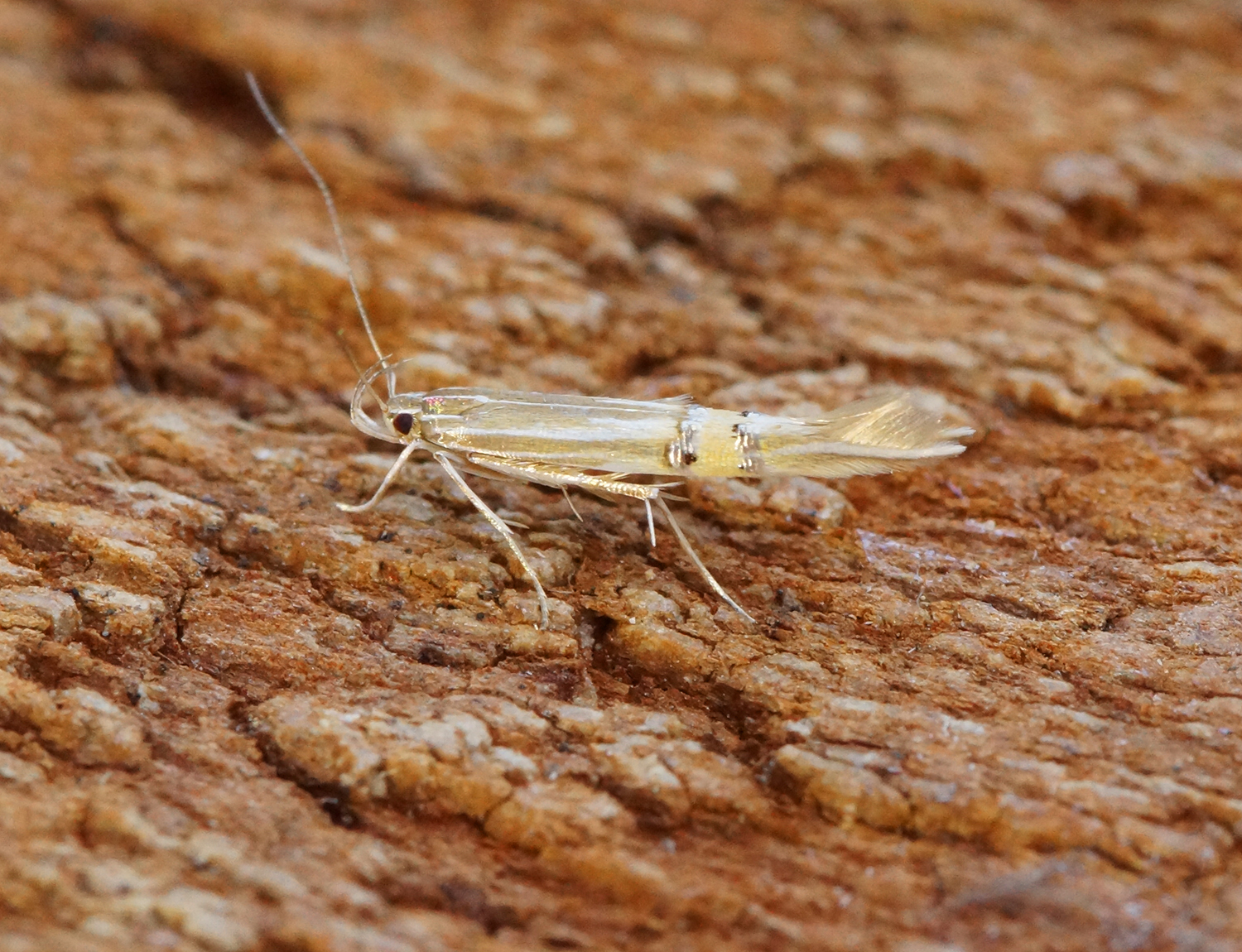
- Cosmopterix lienigiella Chippenham Fen, Cambridgeshire, England
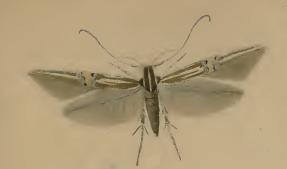

Scientific classification
- Kingdom: Animalia
- Phylum: Arthropoda
- Clade: Pancrustacea
- Class: Insecta
- Order: Lepidoptera
- Family: Cosmopterigidae
- Genus: Cosmopterix
- Species: C. lienigiella

Binomial name
- Cosmopterix lienigiella Zeller, 1846

= Cosmopterix lienigiella =

Species of moth

Cosmopterix lienigiella is a moth of the family Cosmopterigidae. It is found from Fennoscandia to Spain, the Alps and Greece and from Ireland to Ukraine. It is also present in eastern Russia and Japan. It is the type species of the genus Cosmopterix.

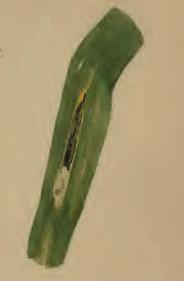
Mined leaf blade of Phragmites

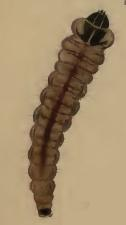
Larva

The wingspan is 10–13 mm. The forewings are light brownish ochreous; costal and dorsal edges white; a fine white longitudinal subcostal line from costa near base to 1/3, another along fold from base to middle, and a short one beneath posterior extremity of this; a somewhat brighter fascia beyond middle, narrowed dorsally, edged with pale golden metallic streaks, posterior interrupted, anterior followed by a variable black spot above middle; a white longitudinal streak from near beyond this to apex. Hindwings are grey. The larva is rosy-whitish, sometimes with rosy transverse bands; dorsal line darker; head black; 2 broad, with a black mark.

Adults are on wing from September to April.

The larvae feed on Phragmites australis. They mine the leaves of their host plant.

== See also ==
Friederike Lienig
