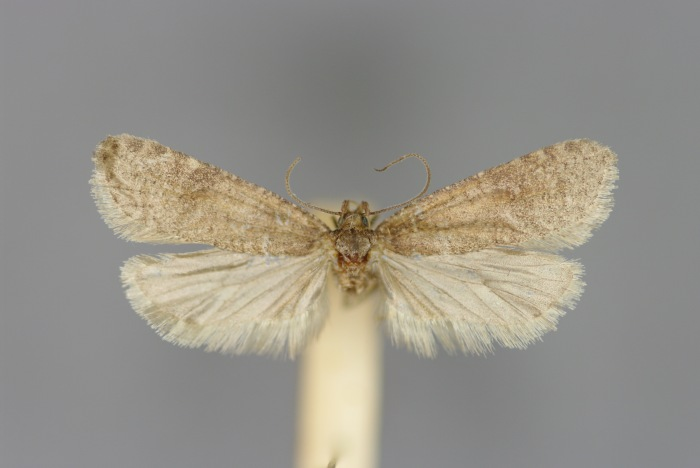

Scientific classification
- Kingdom: Animalia
- Phylum: Arthropoda
- Clade: Pancrustacea
- Class: Insecta
- Order: Lepidoptera
- Family: Depressariidae
- Subfamily: Depressariinae
- Genus: Levipalpus; Hannemann, 1953

Type species
- Depressaria hepatariella Lienig & Zeller, 1846

= Levipalpus =

Genus of moths

Levipalpus is a moth genus of the superfamily Gelechioidea. It is placed in the family Depressariidae, which is often – particularly in older treatments – considered a subfamily of the Oecophoridae or included in the Elachistidae.

== Species ==
- Levipalpus hepatariella (Lienig & Zeller, 1846)
