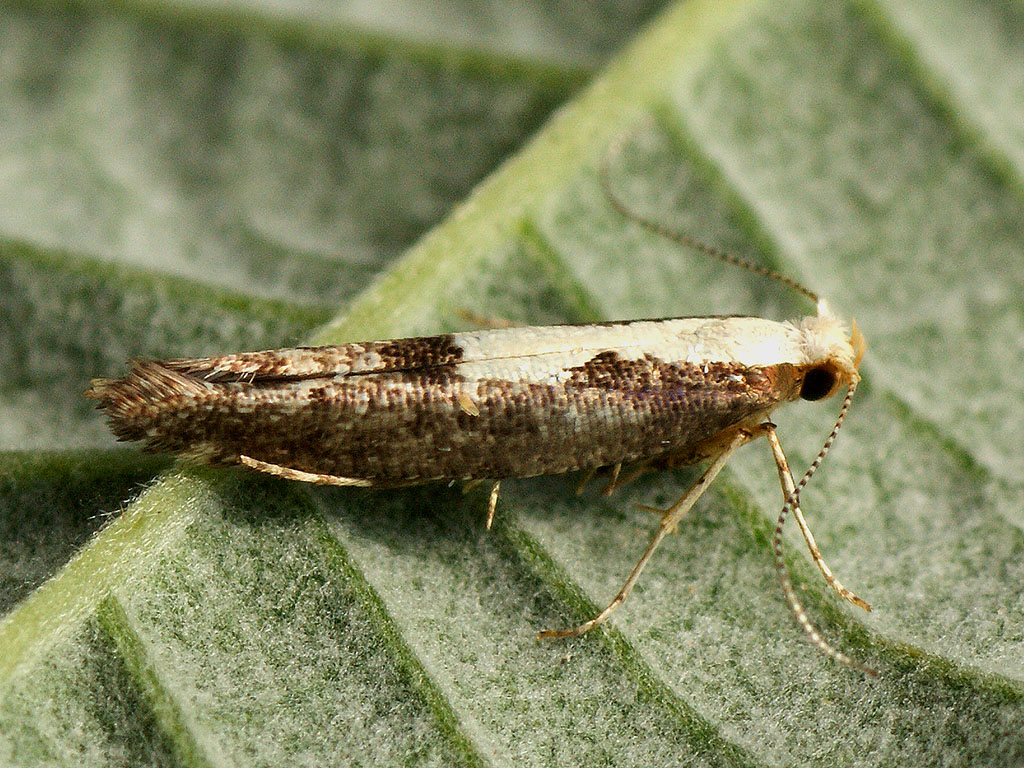

Scientific classification
- Kingdom: Animalia
- Phylum: Arthropoda
- Clade: Pancrustacea
- Class: Insecta
- Order: Lepidoptera
- Family: Argyresthiidae
- Genus: Argyresthia
- Species: A. pulchella

Binomial name
- Argyresthia pulchella Lienig & Zeller, 1846

= Argyresthia pulchella =

Species of moth

Argyresthia pulchella is a moth of the family Yponomeutidae. It is found in Fennoscandia, the Netherlands, France, Germany, Switzerland, Austria, Italy, Poland, the Czech Republic, Slovakia, Romania, Latvia, Estonia and Russia.

The wingspan is 10–13 mm. Adults are on wing from the beginning of June to August.

The larvae feed on rowan (Sorbus aucuparia) and sometimes apple (Malus species) and hazel (Corylus avellana), feeding on the fruit of their host plant.
