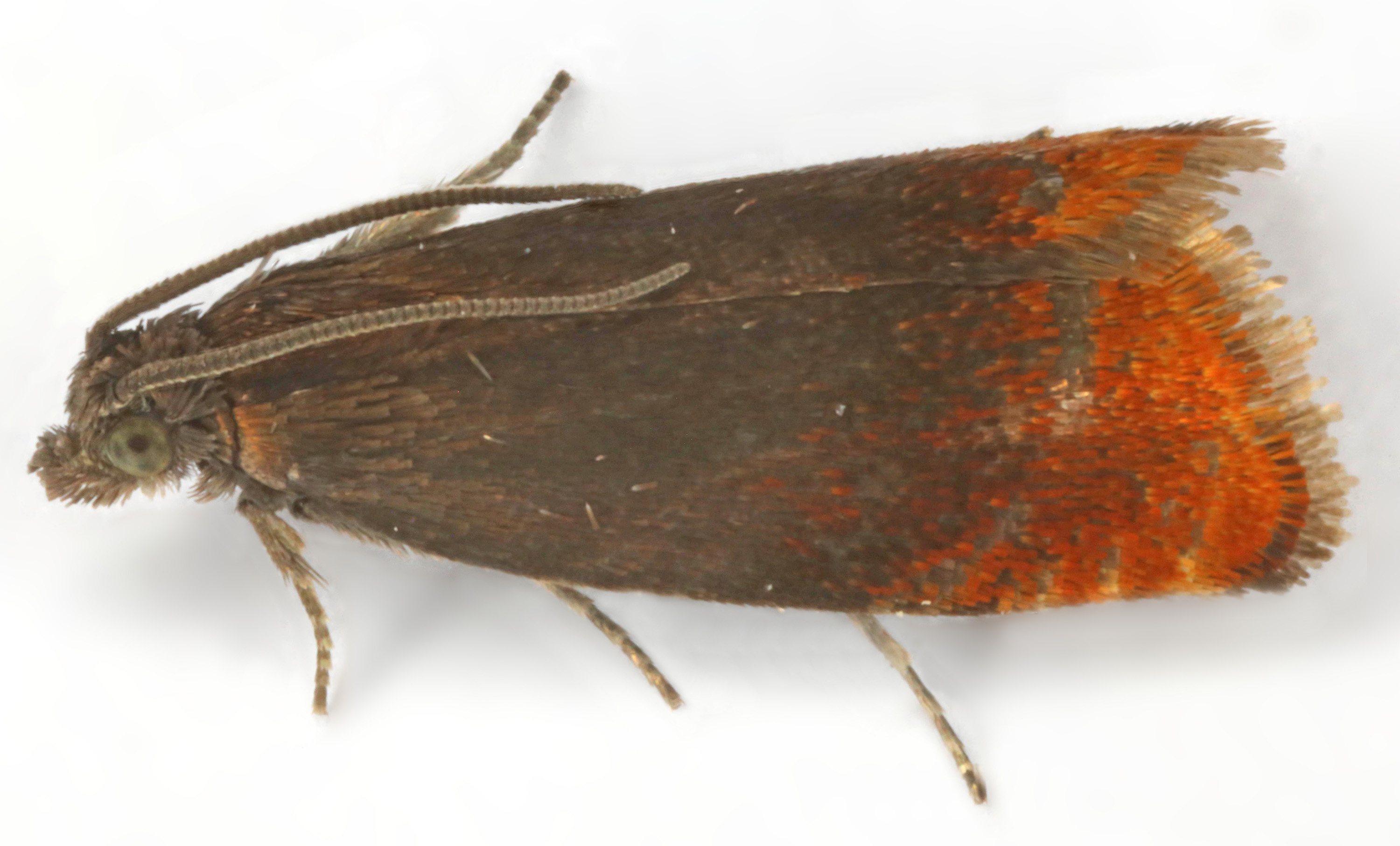

Scientific classification
- Domain: Eukaryota
- Kingdom: Animalia
- Phylum: Arthropoda
- Class: Insecta
- Order: Lepidoptera
- Family: Tortricidae
- Genus: Pammene
- Species: P. rhediella

Binomial name
- Pammene rhediella (Clerck, 1759)

= Pammene rhediella =

Species of moth

Pammene rhediella is a moth belonging to the family Tortricidae. The species was first described by Carl Alexander Clerck in 1759.

It is native to Europe. and across the Palearctic. The wingspan is 9-12 millimeter. The forewings are dark fuscous. The central fascia is darker and ferruginous-tinged and the apical area beyond this wholly deep ferruginous-orange, with leaden-metallic spots and striae. The hindwings fuscous, in males with a blackish spot on vein 1c towards the termen.

The larva develops in the flowers and fruits of shrubs and trees in the rose family, most often on hawthorn but occasionally also on apple and pear. The adults fly in May–June, most during the day in hot sunshine over the tops of hawthorn-trees. Since the species' main nutrient plant is hawthorn, it is usually not considered a problematic pest, but if it attacks fruit trees it can do significant damage.
