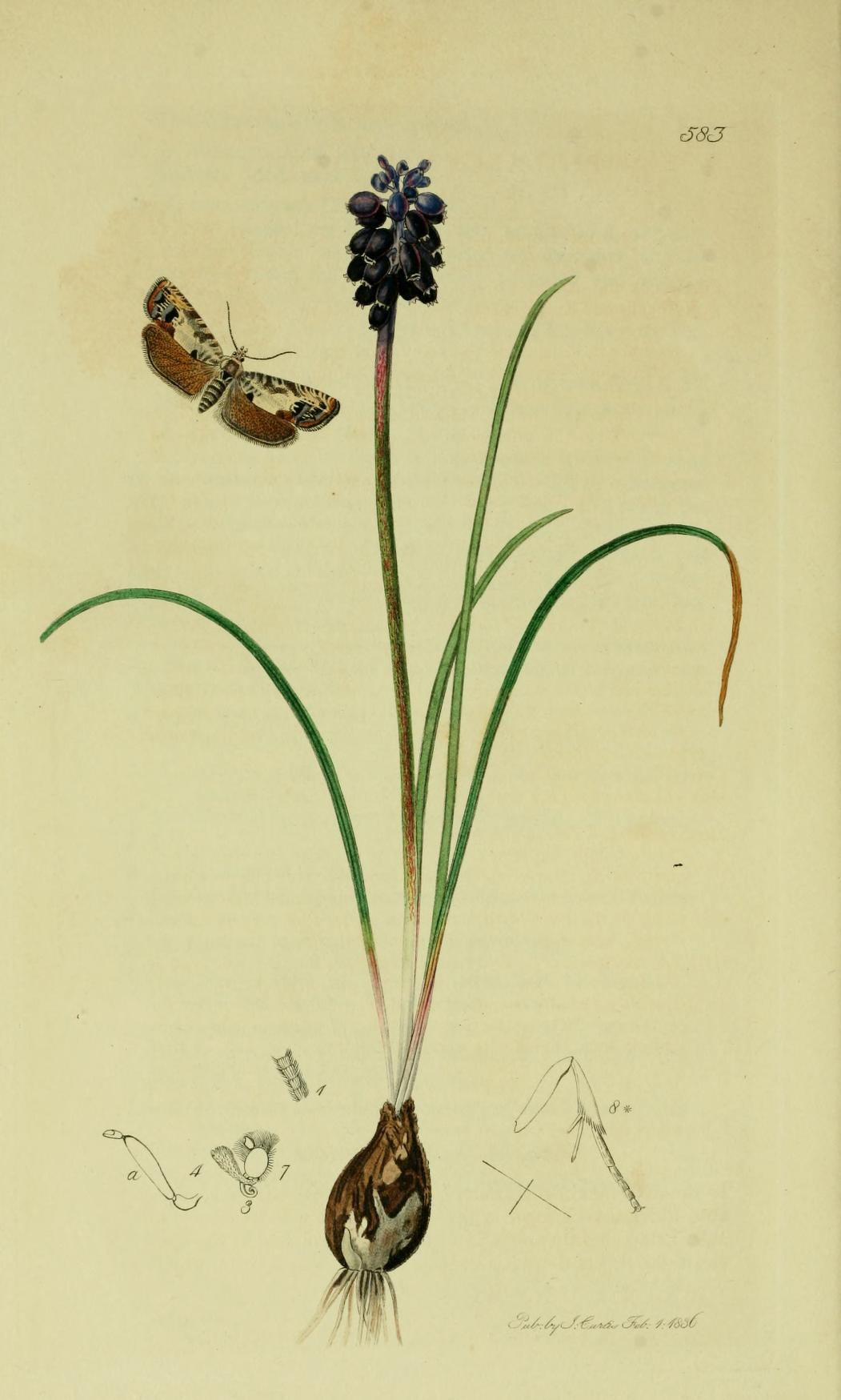
- Illustration from John Curtis's British Entomology Volume 6

Scientific classification
- Kingdom: Animalia
- Phylum: Arthropoda
- Class: Insecta
- Order: Lepidoptera
- Family: Tortricidae
- Genus: Pammene
- Species: P. fasciana

Binomial name
- Pammene fasciana (Linnaeus, 1761)

= Pammene fasciana =

Species of moth

Pammene fasciana, the chestnut leafroller, is a moth of the family Tortricidae. It is found in Europe and across the Palearctic.

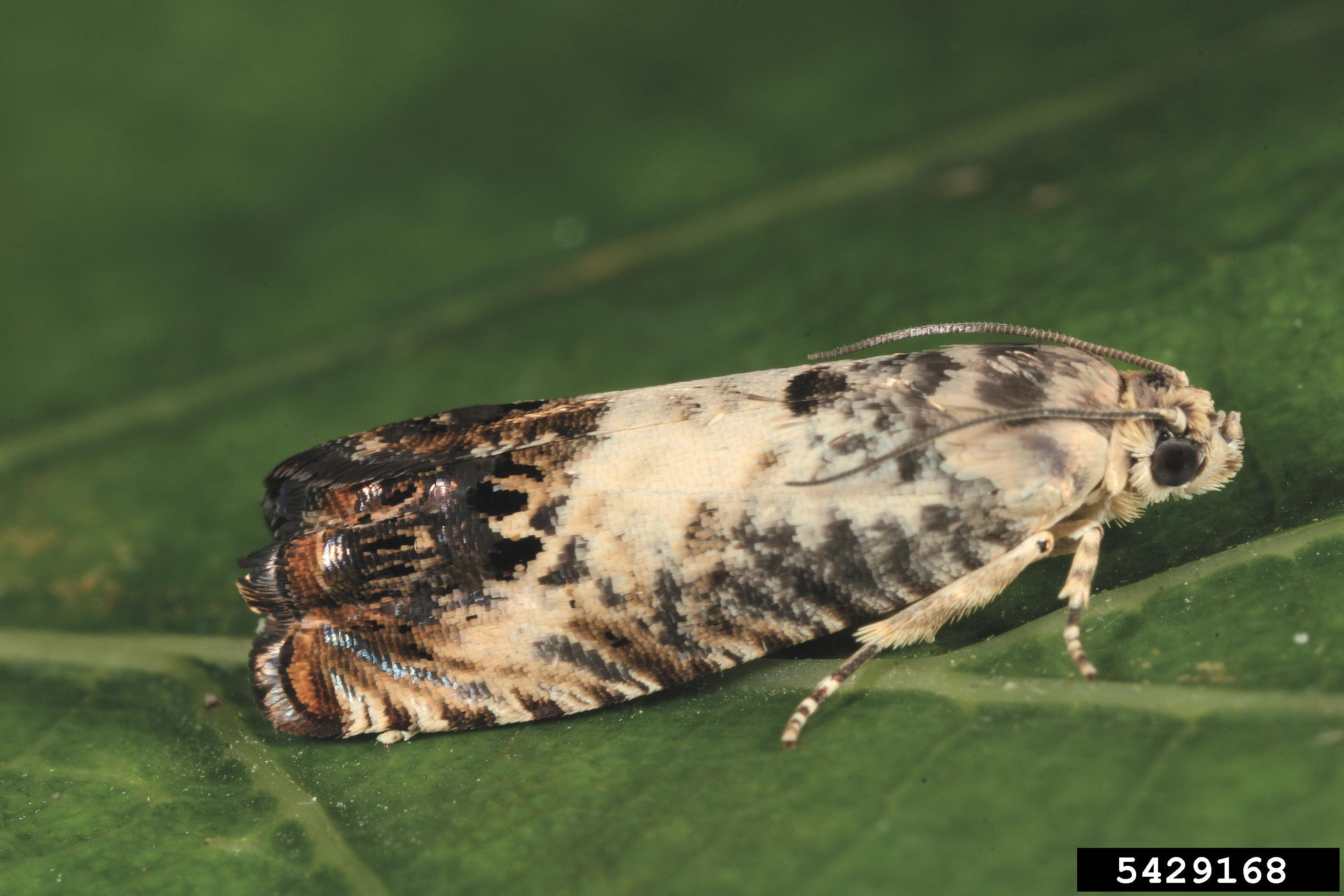
Adult

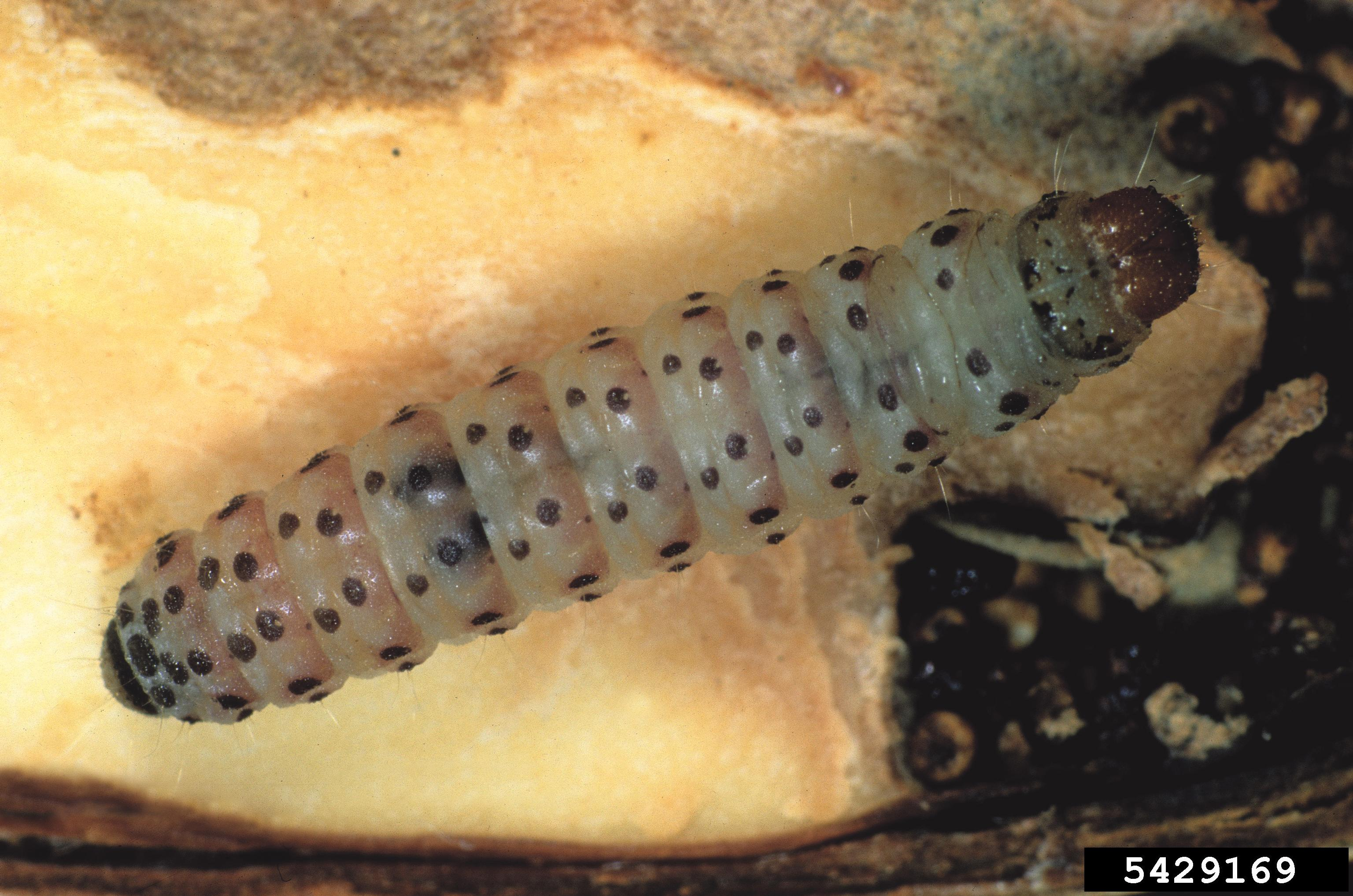
Larva
