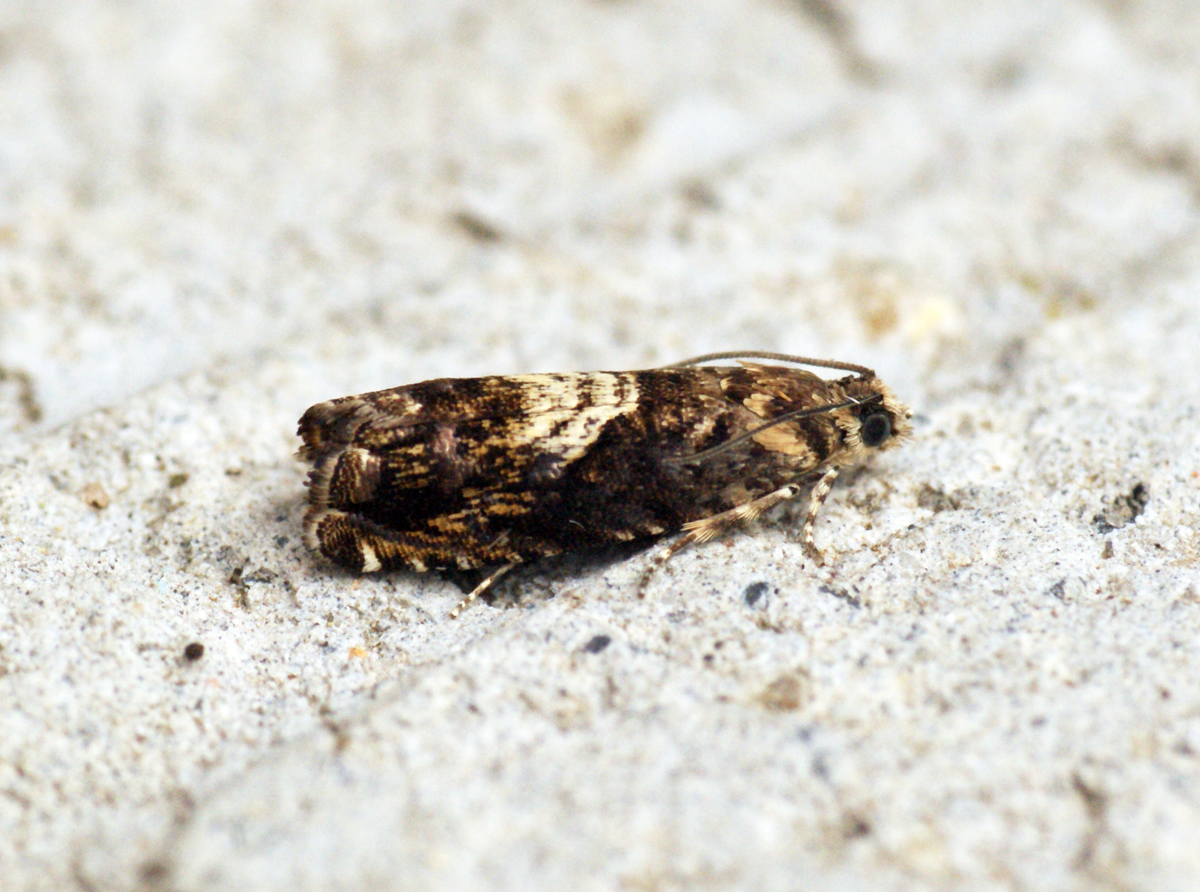

Scientific classification
- Kingdom: Animalia
- Phylum: Arthropoda
- Class: Insecta
- Order: Lepidoptera
- Family: Tortricidae
- Genus: Pammene
- Species: P. albuginana

Binomial name
- Pammene albuginana (Guenee, 1845)

= Pammene albuginana =

Species of moth

Pammene albuginana is a moth belonging to the family Tortricidae. The species was first described by Achille Guenée in 1845.

It is native to Europe.

The wingspan is 11–14 mm. The forewing has a more or less clear white spot at the dorsal edge. The hindwings are solid brown.

Like several other species in the genus Pammene, the larvae of this species develop inside galls made by Cynipoidea on oak Quercus spp.. The adults fly in May-June.
