= Pammene clanculana =

Scientific classification
- Domain: Eukaryota
- Kingdom: Animalia
- Phylum: Arthropoda
- Class: Insecta
- Order: Lepidoptera
- Family: Tortricidae
- Genus: Pammene
- Species: P. clanculana

Binomial name
- Pammene clanculana Tengström, 1869

Species of moth

Pammene clanculana is a moth belonging to the family Tortricidae. The species was first described by Johan Martin Jakob von Tengström in 1869.

It is native to Northern Europe.
