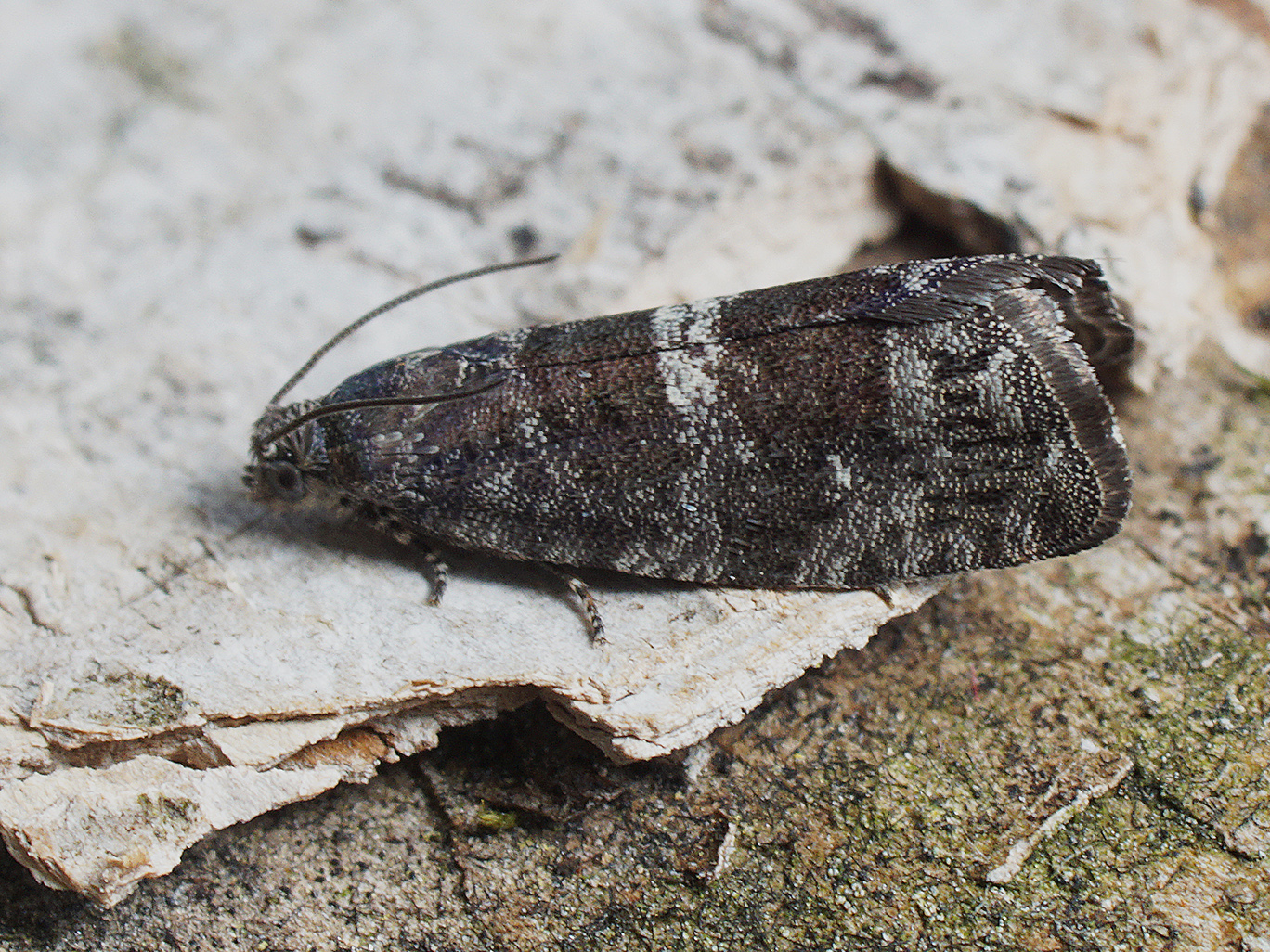
- Pammene obscurana Moscow Oblast

Scientific classification
- Domain: Eukaryota
- Kingdom: Animalia
- Phylum: Arthropoda
- Class: Insecta
- Order: Lepidoptera
- Family: Tortricidae
- Genus: Pammene
- Species: P. obscurana

Binomial name
- Pammene obscurana (Stephens, 1834)

= Pammene obscurana =

Species of moth

Pammene obscurana is a moth belonging to the family Tortricidae. The species was first described by James Francis Stephens in 1834.

It is native to the Palearctic.

12–14 mm is the wingspan. There are no other obvious markings on the forewing other than a square, brownish-white spot with a brown center stripe at the dorsal edge. The back wings are a pale gray-brown color. Meyrick describes it - Forewings rather dark fuscous; some pairs of indistinct pale costal strigulae; a subquadrate spot on middle of dorsum formed of three ill-defined whitish strigulae; ocellus obscurely edged with dull leaden-metallic. Hindwings rather dark fuscous.

The adults fly in May–June.

The larvae feed on Betula spp.
