= Pammene luculentana =

Scientific classification
- Domain: Eukaryota
- Kingdom: Animalia
- Phylum: Arthropoda
- Class: Insecta
- Order: Lepidoptera
- Family: Tortricidae
- Genus: Pammene
- Species: P. luculentana

Binomial name
- Pammene luculentana Kuznetsov, 1962

Species of moth

Pammene luculentana is a species of moth belonging to the family Tortricidae.

It is native to Northern Europe.
