= Pammene spiniana =

Scientific classification
- Domain: Eukaryota
- Kingdom: Animalia
- Phylum: Arthropoda
- Class: Insecta
- Order: Lepidoptera
- Family: Tortricidae
- Genus: Pammene
- Species: P. spiniana

Binomial name
- Pammene spiniana Duponchel, 1842

Species of moth

Pammene spiniana is a moth belonging to the family Tortricidae. The species was first described by Philogène Auguste Joseph Duponchel in 1842.

It is native to Europe. The wingspan is 10-11 mm. The forewings are dark fuscous, with obscure violet - metallic striae, and the costa obscurely paler strigulated. There is a triangular white median dorsal spot, usually enclosing an obscure fuscous dorsal dot. The hindwings are fuscous, in the male with a broad terminal and dorsal dark fuscous fascia, in the female darker throughout.
