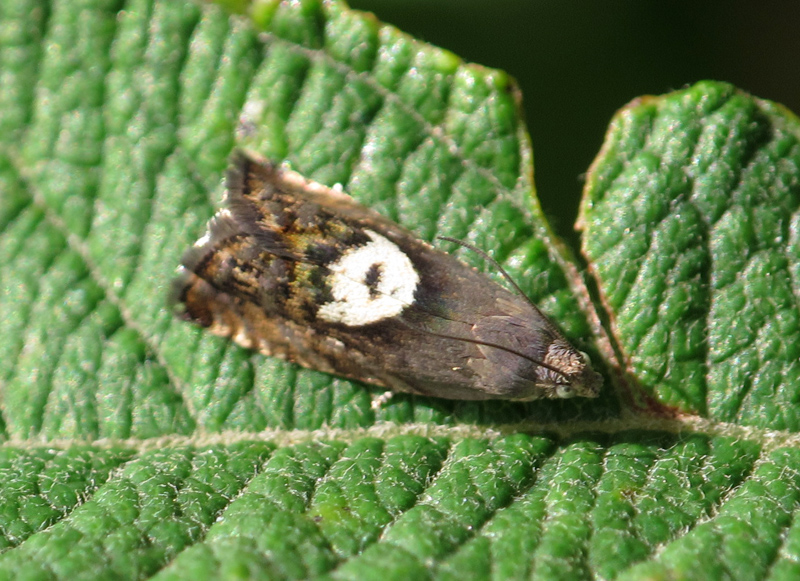

Scientific classification
- Kingdom: Animalia
- Phylum: Arthropoda
- Class: Insecta
- Order: Lepidoptera
- Family: Tortricidae
- Genus: Pammene
- Species: P. populana

Binomial name
- Pammene populana (Fabricius, 1787)

Synonyms
- Pyralis populana Fabricius, 1787; Tortrix ephippana Hubner, [1817]; Phthoroblastis populnana Frey, 1880; Tortrix sticticana Frolich, 1828

= Pammene populana =

Species of moth

Pammene populana, commonly known as the pygmy piercer, a moth species belonging to the family Tortricidae. This species is distributed across most of Europe, with the exception of Portugal, the Balkan Peninsula and Ukraine. Its habitat includes woodlands, marshes, riverbanks, fens, and sand dunes.

The wingspan ranges from 10 to 15 millimeters. Adult moths exhibit a yellowish blotch on the dorsum, featuring a darker central spot. Meyrick's description: Forewings are dark fuscous, with the costa posteriorly strigulated with whitish markings; there is a triangular ochreous-white median dorsal blotch, the apex somewhat bent posteriorly and including a small triangular dark fuscous dorsal spot; three streaks from the costa and margins of the ocellus are leaden-metallic. Hindwings are dark fuscous with a lighter base. The larva is whitish-green with a black head; the plate is black with an anteriorly whitish-green section.

Adults are active and in flight from July to August.

The larvae feed on Salix species and construct shelters using leaf fragments.
