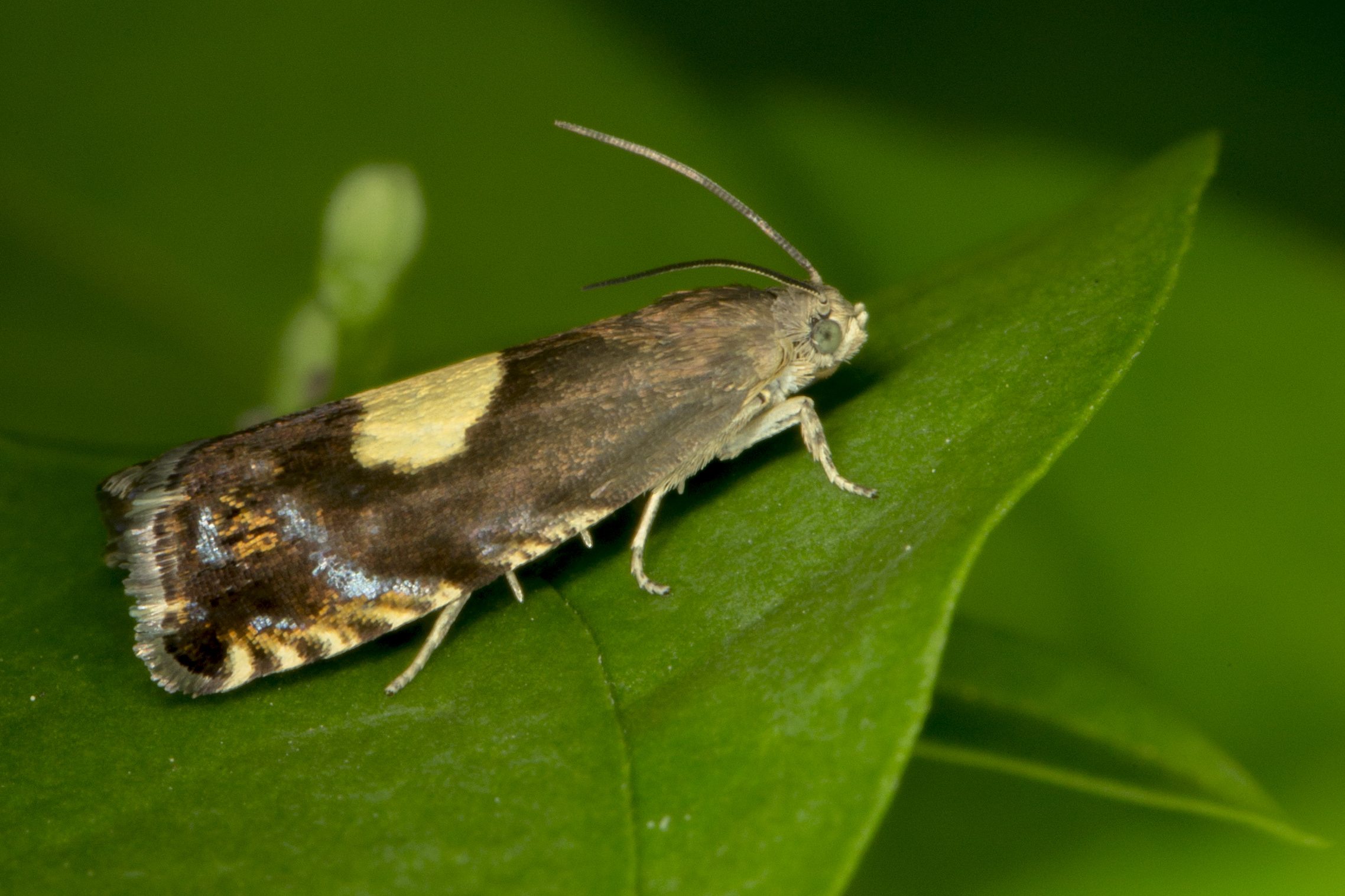
- Pammene trauniana

Scientific classification
- Domain: Eukaryota
- Kingdom: Animalia
- Phylum: Arthropoda
- Class: Insecta
- Order: Lepidoptera
- Family: Tortricidae
- Genus: Pammene
- Species: P. trauniana

Binomial name
- Pammene trauniana (Denis & Schiffermuller, 1775)

= Pammene trauniana =

Species of moth

Pammene trauniana is a species of moth belonging to the family Tortricidae.

It is native to Europe.
