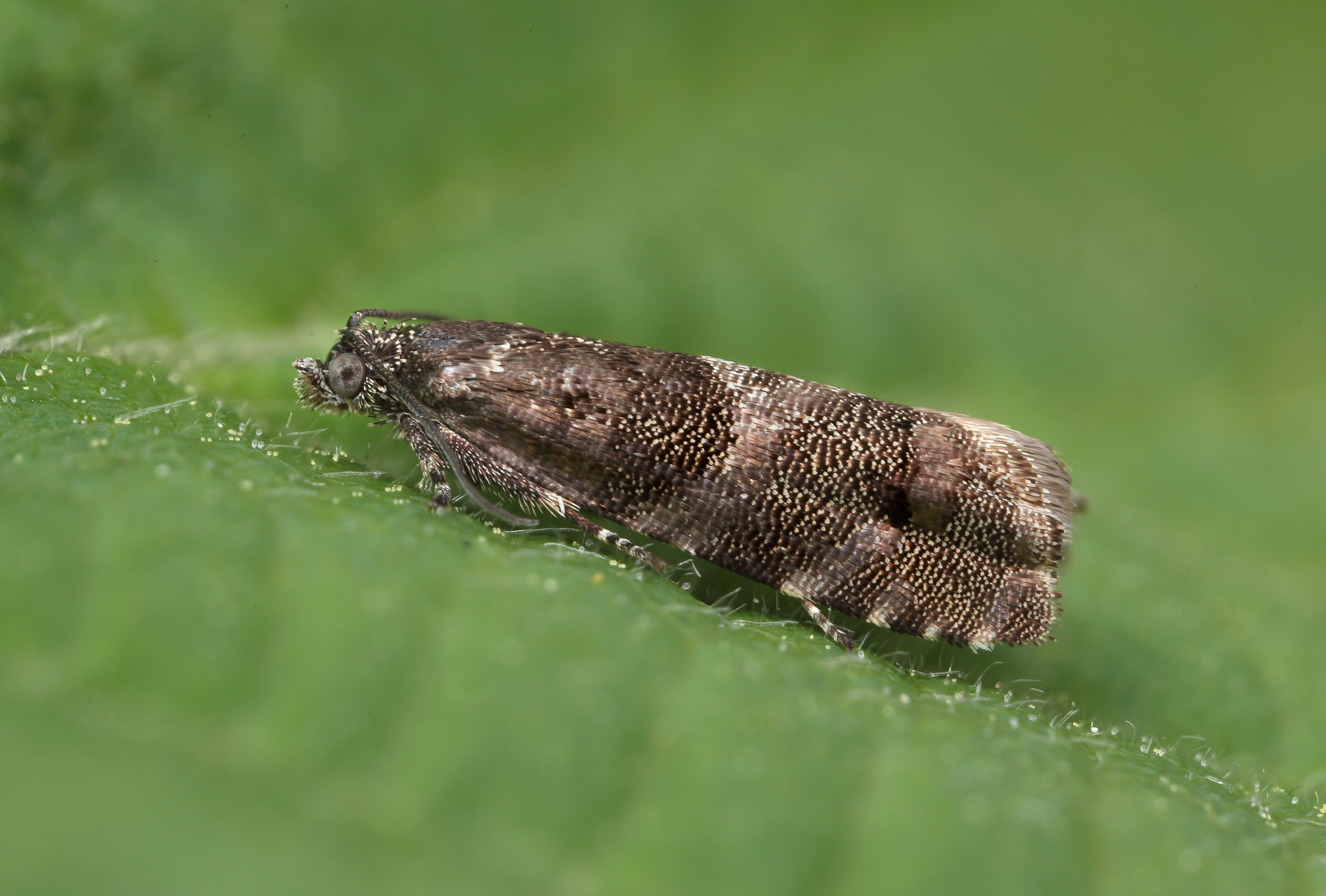

Scientific classification
- Kingdom: Animalia
- Phylum: Arthropoda
- Class: Insecta
- Order: Lepidoptera
- Family: Tortricidae
- Genus: Pammene
- Species: P. splendidulana

Binomial name
- Pammene splendidulana (Guenee, 1845)

= Pammene splendidulana =

Species of moth

Pammene splendidulana is a moth belonging to the family Tortricidae. The species was first described by Achille Guenée in 1845.

It is native to Europe. and parts of North Africa.

The wingspan is 9 11 mm. The forewings are dark fuscous, very finely and closely whitish - striated. The costa is marked with short ochreous whitish streaks becoming silvery-metallic beneath. There is a leaden- metallic fascia within the basal patch and the angulated edge of the basal patch is followed by a leaden-metallic fascia triangularly dilated on the dorsum. The central fascia is followed by a thick leaden metallic stria interrupted in the middle by a black spot. Sometimes there are some black scales in the ocellus. The hindwings are fuscous, more or less whitish-suffused anteriorly. The larva is whitish; spots black; head and plate of 2 black: between joined leaves of oak.

The larvae develop between two interconnected leaves of oak (Quercus spp.). The moths have a fairly extensive flying time in the spring.
