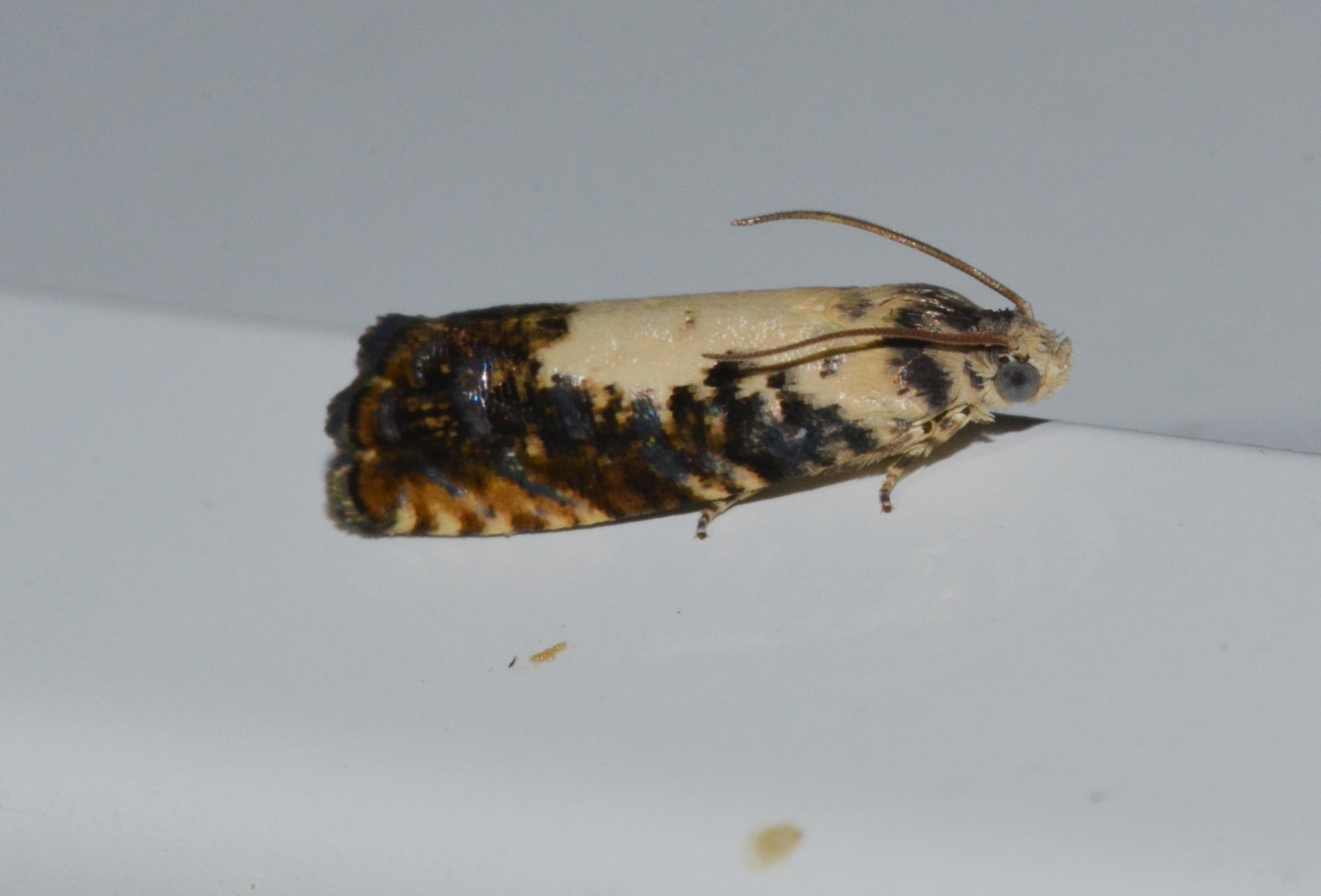

Scientific classification
- Kingdom: Animalia
- Phylum: Arthropoda
- Class: Insecta
- Order: Lepidoptera
- Family: Tortricidae
- Genus: Pammene
- Species: P. felicitana

Binomial name
- Pammene felicitana Heinrich, 1923

= Pammene felicitana =

Species of moth

Pammene felicitana is a species of moth of the family Tortricidae. It is found in North America, where it has been recorded from Alberta, Florida, Illinois, Indiana, Kentucky, Maine, Maryland, North Dakota, Ohio, Oklahoma, Ontario, Pennsylvania, Quebec and Vermont.

The wingspan is about 13 mm. Adults are on wing from May to July.
