= Pammene agnotana =

Scientific classification
- Domain: Eukaryota
- Kingdom: Animalia
- Phylum: Arthropoda
- Class: Insecta
- Order: Lepidoptera
- Family: Tortricidae
- Genus: Pammene
- Species: P. agnotana

Binomial name
- Pammene agnotana Rebel, 1914

Species of butterfly

Pammene agnotana is a species of butterfly belonging to the family Tortricidae.

It is native to Europe.
