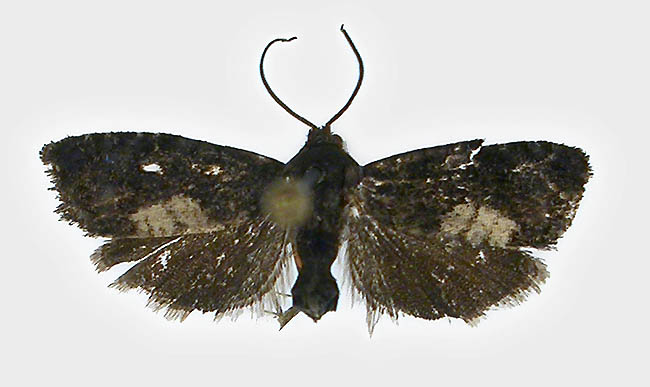

Scientific classification
- Kingdom: Animalia
- Phylum: Arthropoda
- Class: Insecta
- Order: Lepidoptera
- Family: Tortricidae
- Genus: Pammene
- Species: P. ignorata

Binomial name
- Pammene ignorata Kuznetzov, in Danilevsky & Kuznetsov, 1968

= Pammene ignorata =

Species of moth

Pammene ignorata is a moth of the family Tortricidae. In Europe it is found in Great Britain, the Benelux, Fennoscandia, Switzerland, Austria, the Czech Republic, Hungary, Poland and the Baltic region, east to the eastern parts of the Palearctic realm.

The wingspan is 10–12 millimetres (3/8–1/2 in). Adults are on wing from May to July.

The larvae feed on Tilia and Ulmus species.
