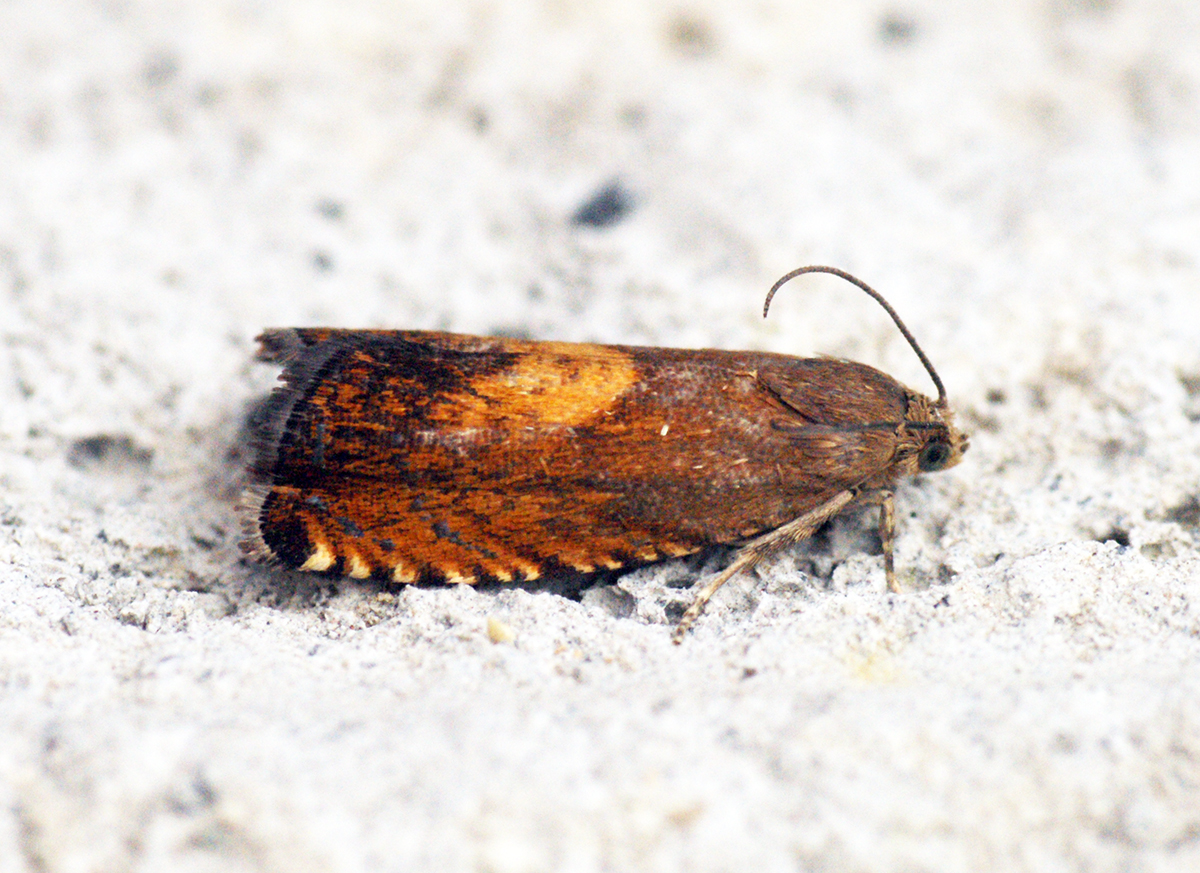

Scientific classification
- Kingdom: Animalia
- Phylum: Arthropoda
- Class: Insecta
- Order: Lepidoptera
- Family: Tortricidae
- Genus: Pammene
- Species: P. aurita

Binomial name
- Pammene aurita Razowski, 1991

= Pammene aurita =

Species of moth

Pammene aurita is a species of moth belonging to the family Tortricidae.

It is native to Europe.
