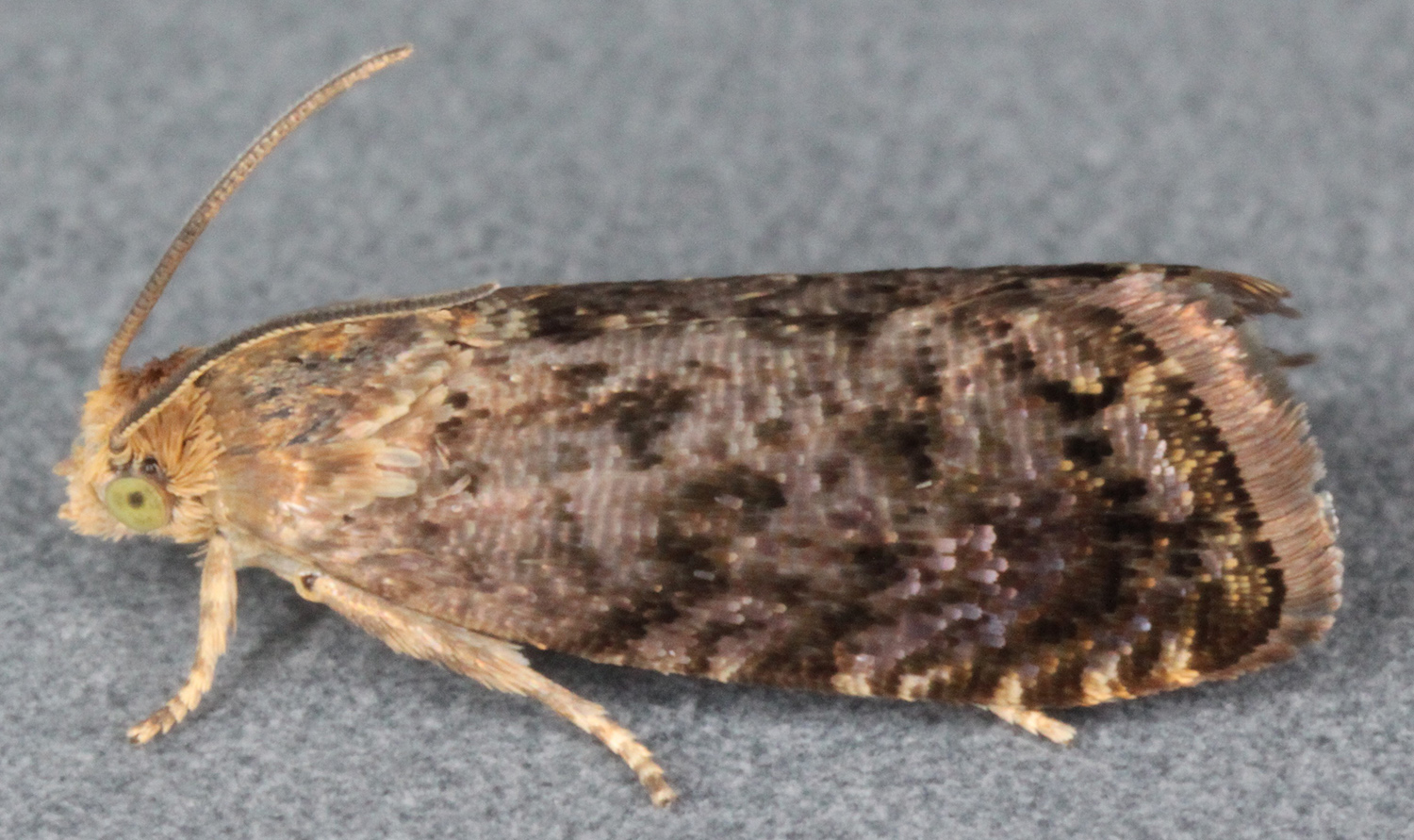

Scientific classification
- Kingdom: Animalia
- Phylum: Arthropoda
- Class: Insecta
- Order: Lepidoptera
- Family: Tortricidae
- Genus: Pammene
- Species: P. gallicana

Binomial name
- Pammene gallicana (Guenee, 1845)

= Pammene gallicana =

Species of moth

Pammene gallicana is a moth belonging to the family Tortricidae first described by Achille Guenée in 1845.

It is native to Europe and the Palearctic.

The wingspan is 10–13 mm. The forewings are fairly dark brown with irregular, silvery cross stripes. The hindwings are light brown.

This species is found primarily on the coast. The adults fly in July–August, mostly during the day. The larvae feed on Daucus carota, Angelica sylvestris and Pastinaca sativa inside silken webs.
