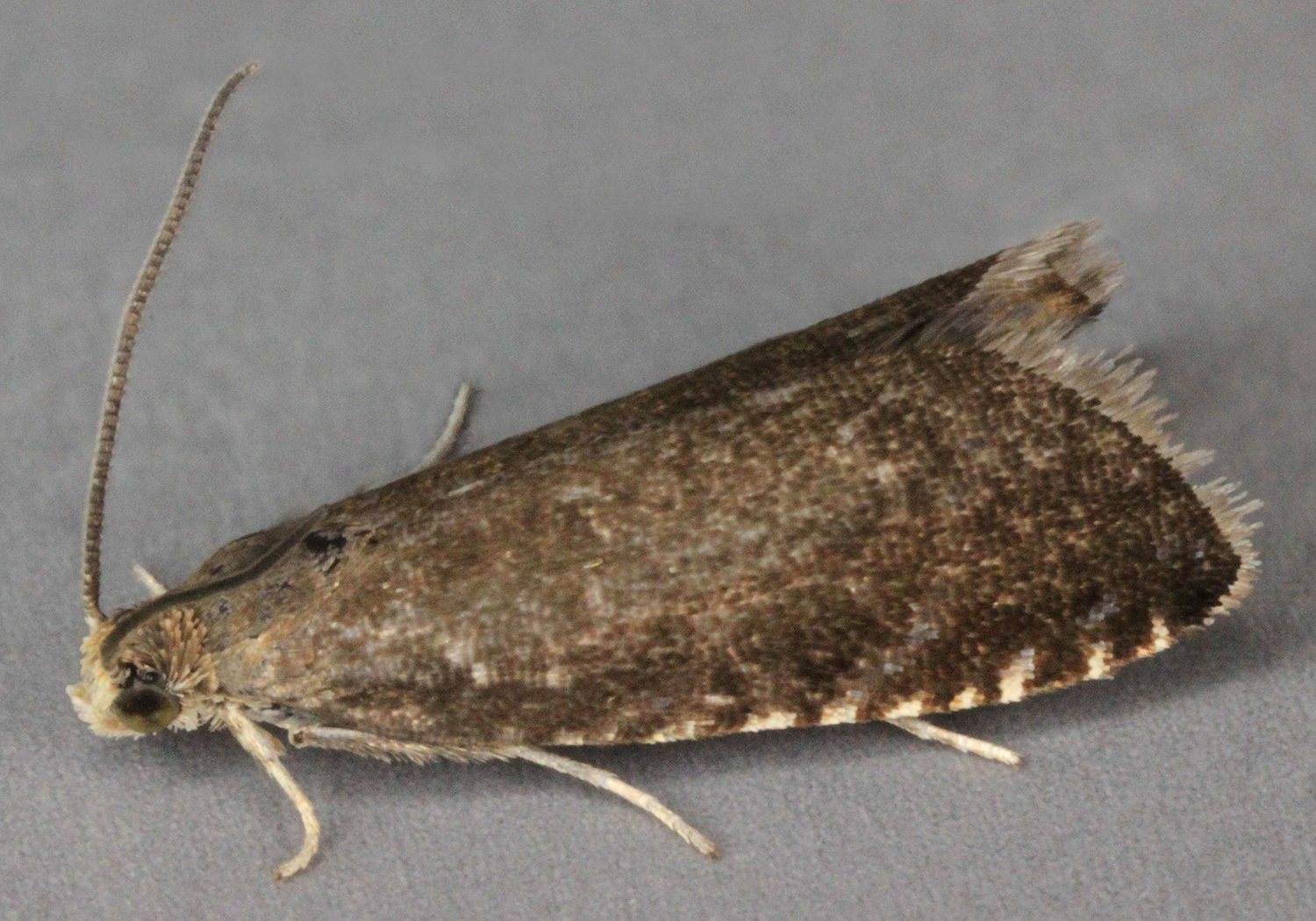

Scientific classification
- Kingdom: Animalia
- Phylum: Arthropoda
- Class: Insecta
- Order: Lepidoptera
- Family: Tortricidae
- Genus: Pammene
- Species: P. germmana

Binomial name
- Pammene germmana (Hübner, 1799)

= Pammene germmana =

Species of moth

Pammene germmana is a moth belonging to the family Tortricidae first described by Jacob Hübner in 1799. It is native to Europe.

The ground colour is dark brown. There is series of cream-coloured strigulae along the costa, interspersed with bluish-metallic streaks.

The adults fly in May and June.

The larvae feed in fruits of plum Prunus, Quercus and Crataegus.
