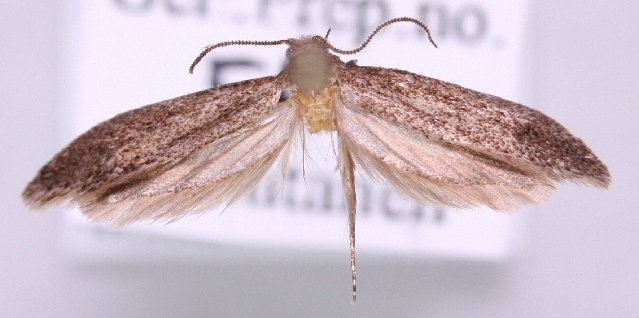
- Elatobia fuliginosella

Scientific classification
- Kingdom: Animalia
- Phylum: Arthropoda
- Clade: Pancrustacea
- Class: Insecta
- Order: Lepidoptera
- Family: Tineidae
- Subfamily: Tineinae
- Genus: Elatobia; Herrich-Schäffer, 1853

= Elatobia =

Genus of moths

Elatobia is a genus of moths belonging to the family Tineidae.

== Species ==
- Elatobia bugrai Koçak, 1981
- Elatobia carbonella (Dietz, 1905)
- Elatobia deltophracta Meyrick, 1926
- Elatobia fuliginosella (Lienig & Zeller, 1846)
- Elatobia kostjuki Zagulajev, 1994
- Elatobia montelliella (Schantz, 1951)
- Elatobia ussurica Zagulajev, 1990
