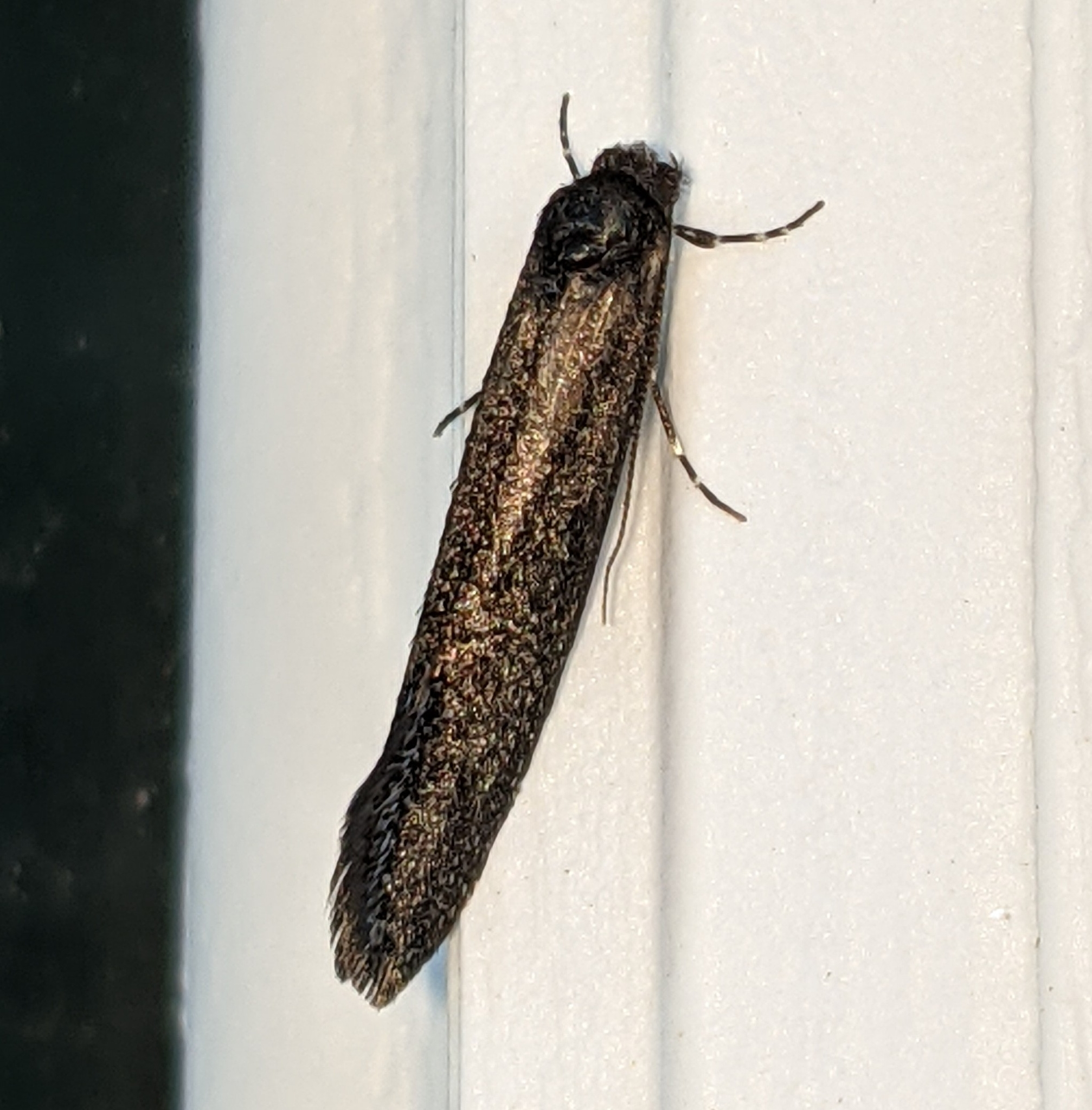

Scientific classification
- Kingdom: Animalia
- Phylum: Arthropoda
- Class: Insecta
- Order: Lepidoptera
- Family: Tineidae
- Genus: Elatobia
- Species: E. montelliella

Binomial name
- Elatobia montelliella (Schantz, 1951)

Synonyms
- Tinea montelliella Schantz, 1951

= Elatobia montelliella =

Species of moth

Elatobia montelliella is a species of moth in the family Tineidae. It is found in Finland, as well as North America where has been recorded from Alberta and Utah.

The wingspan is 16–22 mm.
