= Pammene insulana =

Scientific classification
- Kingdom: Animalia
- Phylum: Arthropoda
- Class: Insecta
- Order: Lepidoptera
- Family: Tortricidae
- Genus: Pammene
- Species: P. insulana

Binomial name
- Pammene insulana (Guenee, 1845)

Species of moth

Pammene insulana is a moth belonging to the family Tortricidae. The species was first described by Achille Guenée in 1845.

It is native to Europe.
