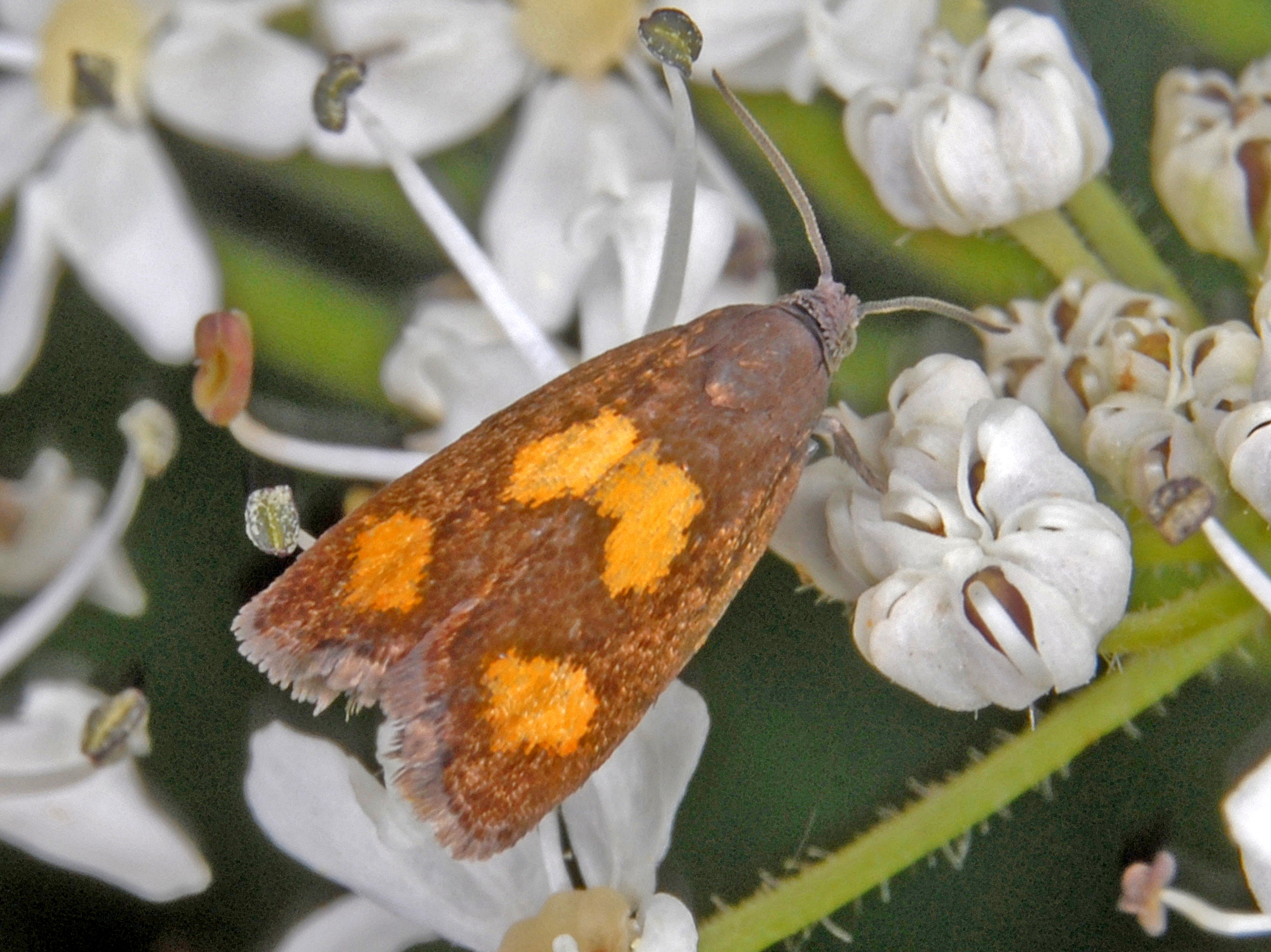
- Pammene aurana. Dorsal view
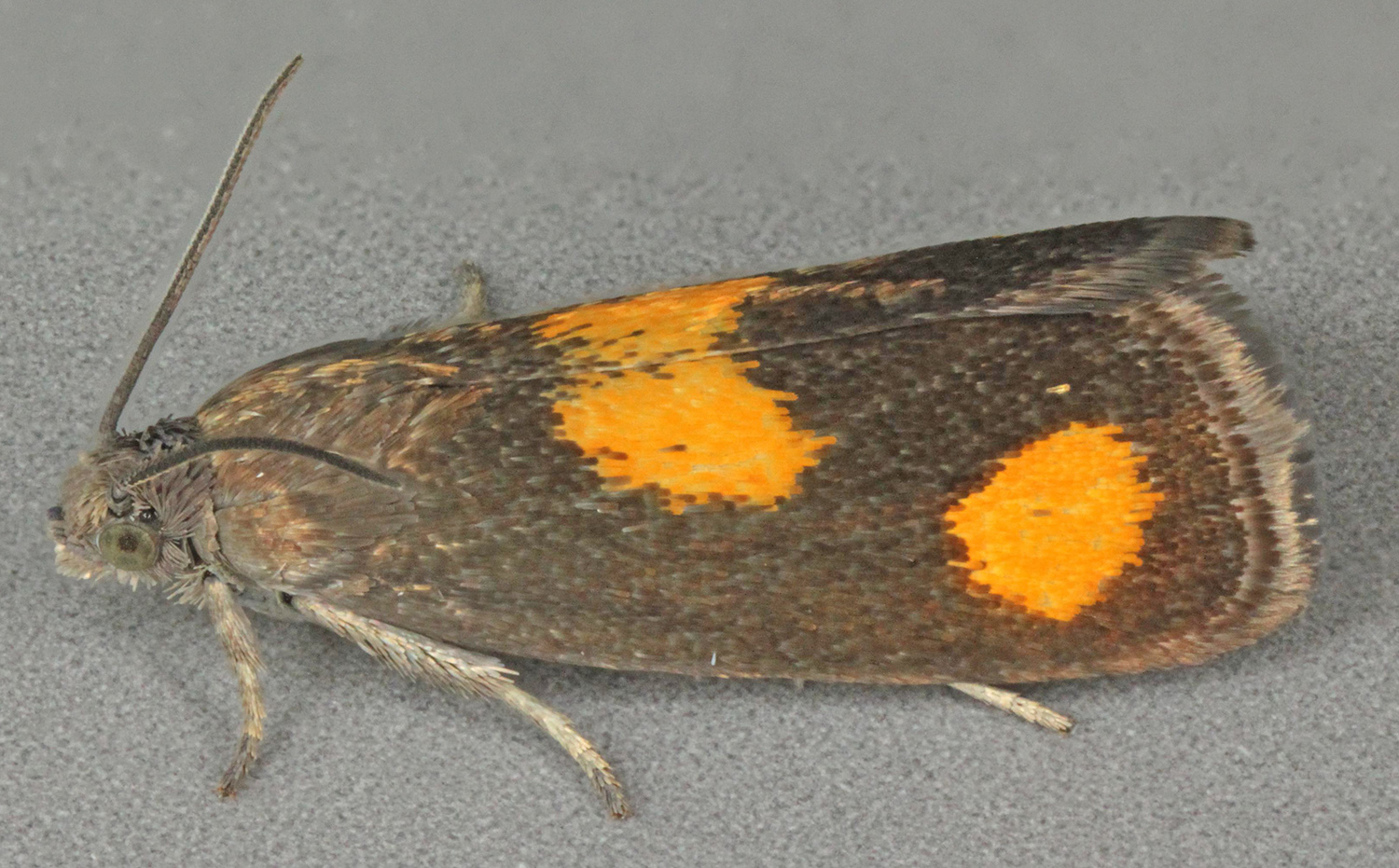
- Side view

Scientific classification
- Kingdom: Animalia
- Phylum: Arthropoda
- Clade: Pancrustacea
- Class: Insecta
- Order: Lepidoptera
- Family: Tortricidae
- Genus: Pammene
- Species: P. aurana

Binomial name
- Pammene aurana (Fabricius, 1775)

Synonyms
- Grapholitha aurantiana Kollar, 1832; Tinea bimaculella Thunberg & Wenner, 1794; Laspeyresia aurana ab. cuprea Obraztsov, 1959; Pyralis fulvana Fabricius, 1798; Tinea fulvella Fabricius, 1794; Tortrix mediana [Denis & Schiffermüller], 1775; Laspeyresia aurana ab. obscurana Obraztsov, 1959; Cydia aurana (Fabricius)

= Pammene aurana =

Species of moth

Pammene aurana is a moth of the family Tortricidae.

== Distribution ==
This species can be found in most of Europe and the Palearctic. To the east, the distribution extends over southern Siberia, the Alatau to the region Primorsky Krai in the Far East.

== Habitat ==
These moths occur in gardens, forest clearings, hedgerows, woodland edges, forest roads and roadsides.

== Description ==
Video clip

Pammene aurana has a wingspan of 9–13 mm. These moths show chocolate brown or reddish brown forewings with yellow-orange blotches. They usually have two almost round yellow-orange spots before the wing's outer edge and a large round or semicircular yellow-orange marking in the middle at the wing's rear edge. The fringes are dark brown. The hind wings are dark. Head, thorax, abdomen and antennae are brown to dark brown. In the form Pammene aurana var. aurantiana the various yellow-orange markings flow together and only the wing base, the costa and the outer edge are brown.

The caterpillars are whitish with a shiny black-brown head. They can reach a length of about 5 millimetres (0.20 in).

== Biology ==
Adults are on wing from June to August. They are active in sunshine. The feed on nectar of the common hogweed (Heracleum sphondylium) and of giant hogweed (Heracleum mantegazziannum). There is one generation per year (univoltine species). The eggs are laid in the flowers of said plants. The larvae live within a spinning of the seeds of these flowers and feed on them. They hibernate from October in a silk cocoon under the ground and pupates the following year in spring inside that cocoon. The moths hatch in June and July.
