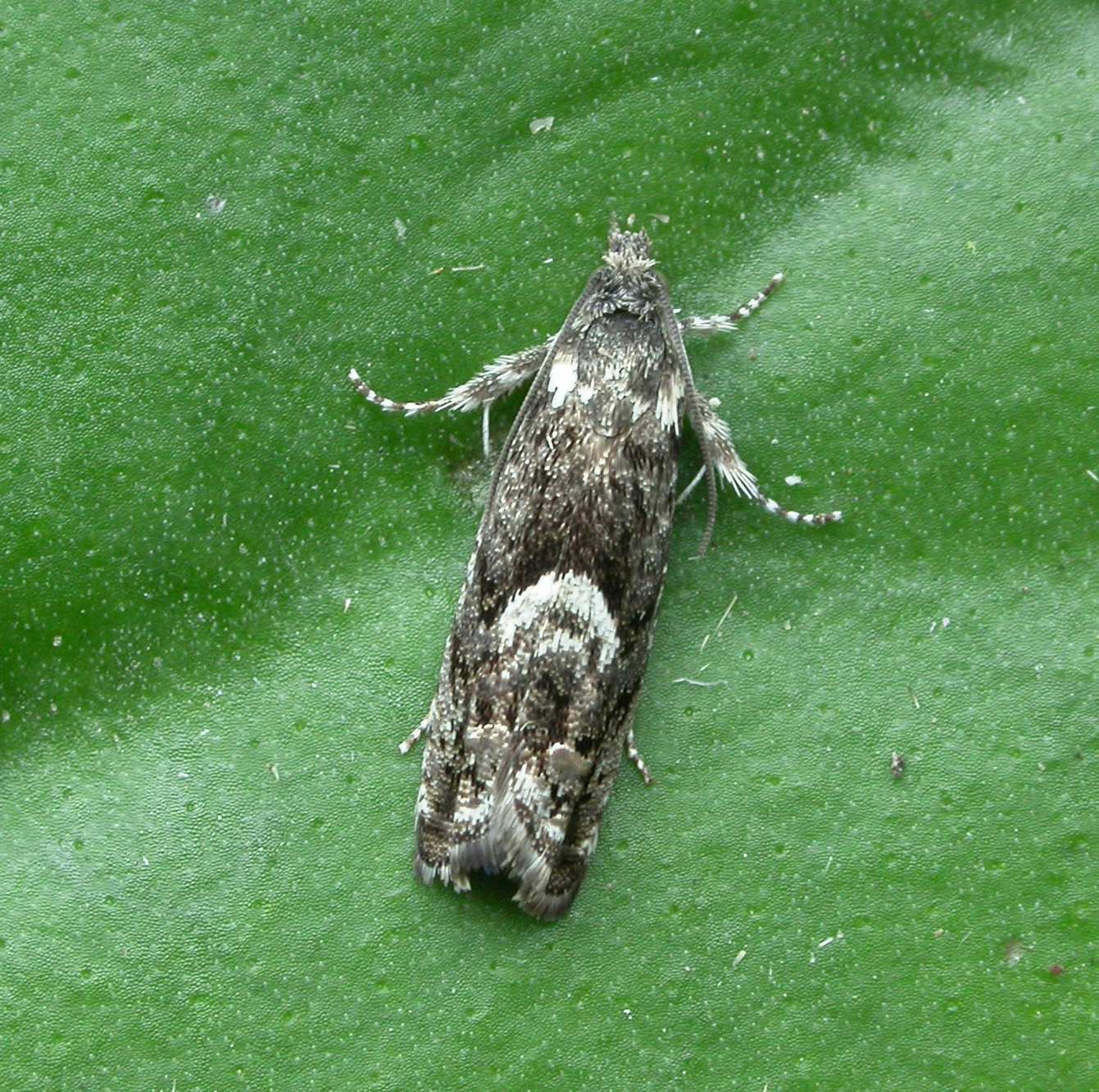

Scientific classification
- Domain: Eukaryota
- Kingdom: Animalia
- Phylum: Arthropoda
- Class: Insecta
- Order: Lepidoptera
- Family: Tortricidae
- Genus: Pammene
- Species: P. giganteana

Binomial name
- Pammene giganteana Peyerimhoff, 1863

= Pammene giganteana =

Species of moth

Pammene giganteana is a micromoth belonging to the family Tortricidae. The species was first described by Henri de Peyerimhoff in 1863.

It is native to Europe. The wingspan is 14–16 mm. The narrow forewings have a lighter, comma-shaped spot at the dorsal edge. When the moth rests, these spots form a horseshoe-shape on the dorsum. The hindwings are white at the base and disc, brown along the margin.

The adults fly from March to May.

The larvae feed on the galls of Cynipidae.
