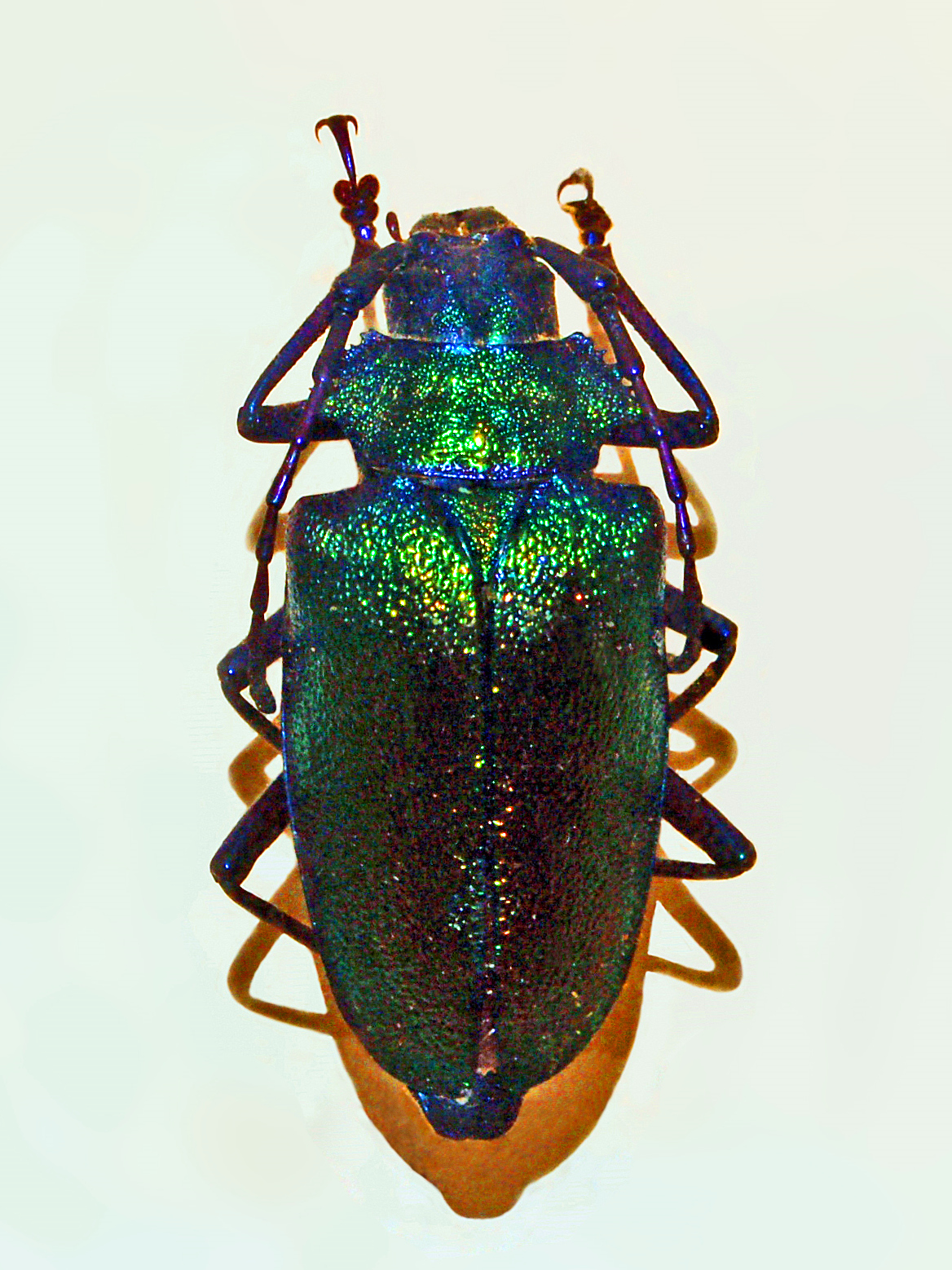
- From Brazil

Scientific classification
- Kingdom: Animalia
- Phylum: Arthropoda
- Clade: Pancrustacea
- Class: Insecta
- Order: Coleoptera
- Suborder: Polyphaga
- Infraorder: Cucujiformia
- Family: Cerambycidae
- Subfamily: Prioninae
- Tribe: Mallaspini
- Genus: Pyrodes; Audinet-Serville, 1832
- Species: P. nitidus

Binomial name
- Pyrodes nitidus (Fabricius, 1787)

Synonyms
- Cerambyx nitidus (Fabricius) Gmelin, 1790; Prionus angulatus Olivier, 1795; Prionus nitidus Fabricius, 1787; Prionus pallasii Germar, 1824; Prionus speciosus Olivier, 1795; Pyrodes aeneus Buquet, 1860; Pyrodes angulatus (Olivier) Audinet-Serville, 1832; Pyrodes speciosus (Olivier) Audinet-Serville, 1832

= Pyrodes =

Pyrodes nitidus

Genus of beetles

Pyrodes is a genus of beetles in the family Cerambycidae. It is monotypic, being represented by the single species Protorma nitidus.

== Description ==
Pyrodes nitidus can reach a length of 30–40 millimetres (1.2–1.6 in). The basic coloration is metallic blue-green or purple-green. Pronotum and elytra are densely punctured, with a large ridge on each side of the thorax.

== Distribution and habitat ==
This species can be found in Argentina, south-eastern Brazil and Paraguay.
