= Friederike Lienig =

Latvian entomologist

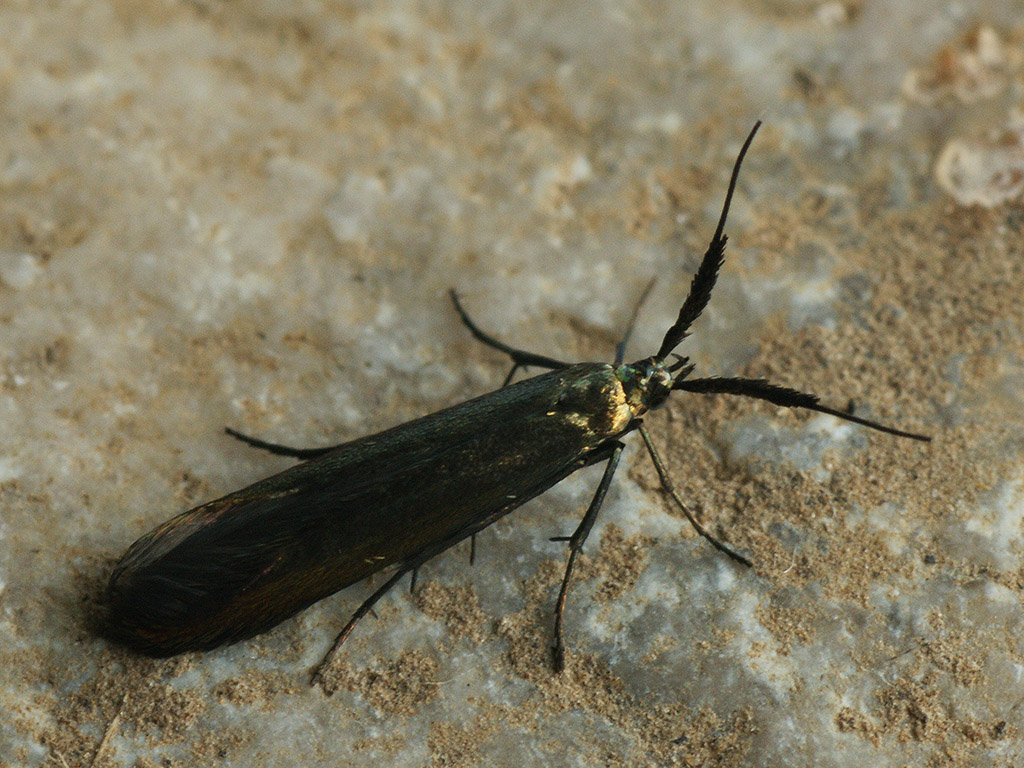
Coleophora deauratella discovered and first described by Friederike Lienig

Friederike Lienig (née Berg) (December 8, 1790, Forstei Dubena, Finland – 7 June, 1855, Dresden) was an entomologist from the Russian Empire who also resided in the Kingdom of Prussia. At first self-taught, she was later instructed by Philipp Christoph Zeller at the technical high school in Meseritz. She was a Member of the Stettin Entomological Society.

She published her first list of lepidoptera in 1840; her second list (with Zeller) was published in 1846.

She described several new moths including Ortholepis vacciniella, Udea inquinatalis, Argyresthia pulchella and Coleophora deauratella with Zeller.

== Family ==
She was married to Georg Friedrich Lienig, a Christian preacher; they lived in Koknese.

== Honours ==
Four species of tiny moths are named after her. One is Cosmopterix lienigiella.

== Works ==
- Lepidopterologische Fauna von Livland und Curland (m. Anm. v. P. C. Zeller), in: Isis v. Oken 1846, 175-302
