= Philipp Christoph Zeller =

German entomologist (1808–1883)

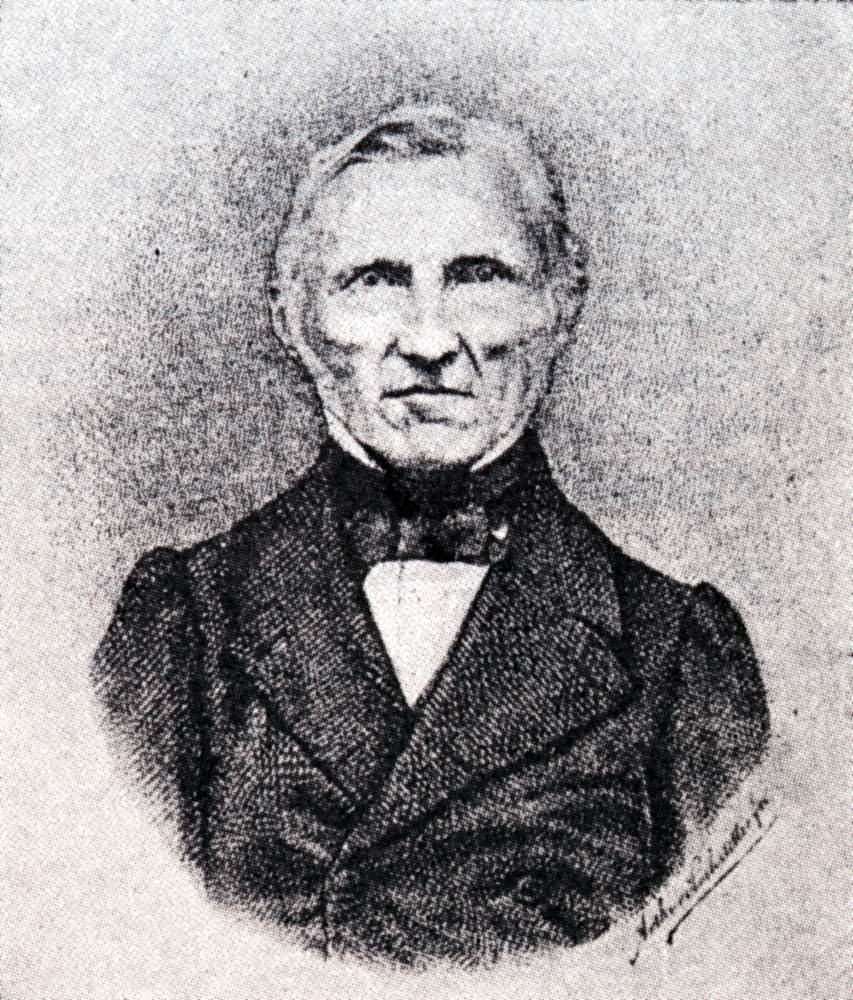
Philipp Christoph Zeller

Philipp Christoph Zeller (8 April 1808 – 27 March 1883) was a German entomologist.

Zeller was born at Steinheim an der Murr, Württemberg, two miles from Marbach, the birthplace of Schiller. The family moved to Frankfurt (Oder) where Philipp went to the gymnasium where natural history was not taught. Instead, helped by Alois Metzner, he taught himself entomology mainly by copying books. Copying and hence memorising, developed in response to early financial privation became a lifetime habit. Zeller went next to the University of Berlin where he became a candidat, which is the first degree, obtained after two or three years' study around 1833. The subject was philology. He became an Oberlehrer or senior primary school teacher in Glogau in 1835. Then he became an instructor at the secondary school in Frankfurt (Oder) and in 1860 he was appointed as the senior instructor of the highest technical high school in Meseritz. He resigned this post after leaving in 1869 for Stettin, home of the Stettin Entomological Society.

Zeller's first entomological studies were of Coleoptera and Diptera and he especially admired Johann Wilhelm Meigen's "Zweiflügler". This is of great importance since studies of Lepidoptera were then, as now, more concerned with species descriptions than with systematics and phylogenetic relationships and the nomenclature was already very confused (and confusing). Zeller's precise, orderly approach culminated in the most significant lepidopterological work of the nineteenth century – The Natural History of the Tineina. This, a monumental 13-volume monograph, was commenced in 1855 and completed in 1873. The other main authors were the Englishman Henry Tibbats Stainton, a Swiss, Heinrich Frey and another Englishman, John William Douglas. The Natural History of the Tineina appeared in English, French, German and Latin editions, the Irish entomologist Alexander Henry Haliday doing the bulk of the translations. The work established Zeller as perhaps the greatest lepidopterist of the century. He named 186 new genera of moths. His collection was acquired by Thomas de Grey, 6th Baron Walsingham and later donated to the Natural History Museum.

== Selected works ==
- Versuch einer naturgemässen Eintheilung der Schaben, Tinea (Oken's Isis, 1839).
- Kritische Bestimmung der in Reaumur's Memoiren vorkommenden Lepidopteren (Isis, 1838)
- Kritische Bestimmung der in de Geer's Memoiren enthaltenen Schmetterlinge (Isis, 1839)
- Monographie des Genus Hyponomeuta (Isis, 1844)
- Anmerkungen zu Lienig's Lepidopterologischer Fauna von Livland und Curland (Isis,1846)
- Die Arten der Blattminirergattung Lithocolletis (Linnaea, 1846)
- Bemerkungen über die auf einer Reise nach Italien und Sicilien gesammelten Schmetterlingsarten" (Isis, 1847)
- Verzeichnis der vom Professor Dr. Loew in der Türkei und Asien gesammelten Lepidoptera Isis von Oken 1847 (1) : 3-39 (1847)
- Exotische Phyciden (Isis, 1848)
- Beitrag zur Kenntnis der Coleophoren" (Isis, 1849)
- Revision der Pterophoriden (Isis, 1852)
- Lepidoptera microptera quae J. A. Wahlberg in caffrorum terra legit (Stockholm, 1852)
- Die Arten der Gattung Butalis (Linnaea, 1855)
- With Henry Tibbats Stainton, Heinrich Frey and John William Douglas The Natural History of the Tineina, 13 volumes, 2000 pages (1855)
- Beiträge zur Kenntnis der nordamerikanischen Nachtfalter" (3 parts, Verh. zool. bot. Gesellsch. Wien, 1872–73)
- Beiträge zur Lepidopterenfauna der Ober-Albula in Graubünden (Verh. zool. bot. Gesellsch. Wien., 1877)
- Exotische Lepidopteren (Horae soc. ent. Rossica, 1877)

== See also ==
Friederike Lienig
