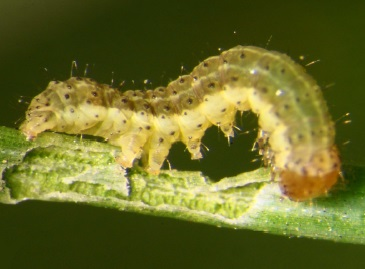

Scientific classification
- Kingdom: Animalia
- Phylum: Arthropoda
- Clade: Pancrustacea
- Class: Insecta
- Order: Lepidoptera
- Superfamily: Noctuoidea
- Family: Noctuidae
- Genus: Xestia
- Species: X. brunneopicta

Binomial name
- Xestia brunneopicta (Matsumura, 1925)

Synonyms
- Anomogyna brunneopicta Matsumura, 1925

= Xestia brunneopicta =

Species of moth

Xestia brunneopicta is a moth of the family Noctuidae. It is found from Magadan to the east-Siberian Tuva in Russia. It has also been recorded from northern Finland.

The larvae feed on various plants, including Andromeda polifolia, Salix phylicifolia, Larix gmelini, Larix decidua and Larix sibirica. Young larvae have a pale greenish grey body and pale brown head. Full-grown larvae reach a length of 35–40 mm. They have a brown head and the dorsal and ventral regions of the body are green, with the middorsal and subdorsal lines white, narrow, short and broken.

== Life cycle gallery ==
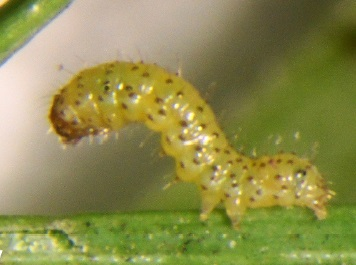
1st instar larva

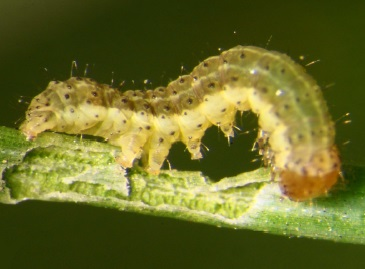
2nd instar larva

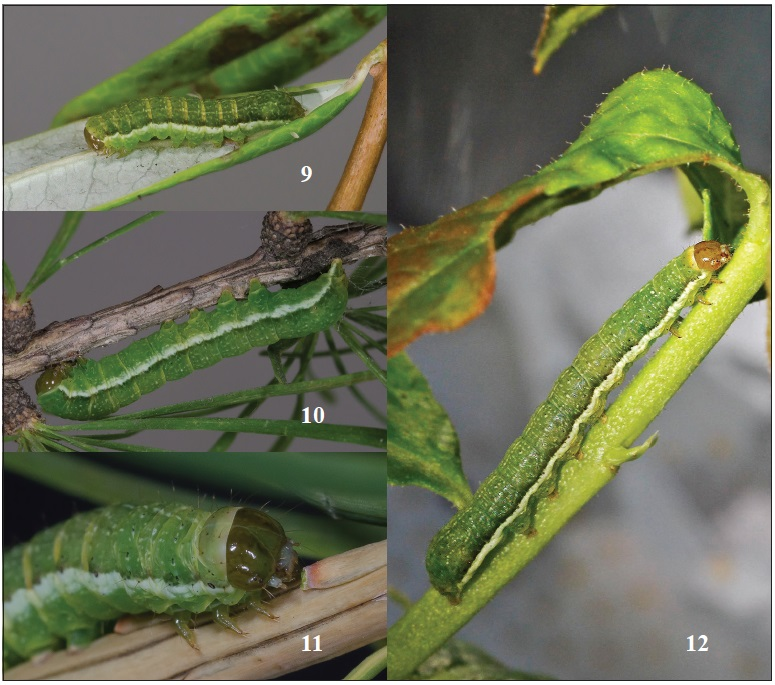
9. The 3rd instar larva on Andromeda polifolia; 10. The 4th instar larva on Larix decidua Miller (Pinaceae); 11. Last instar larva with darker brown head; 12. Mature larva on Salix phylicifolia

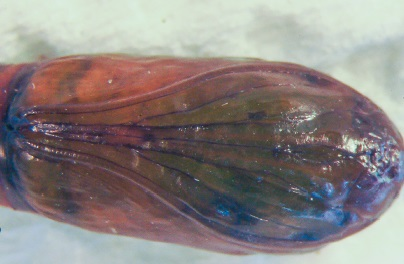
Pupa
