= Larix europaea =

Larix europaea can refer to:

- Larix europaea DC., a synonym of Larix decidua var. decidua
- Larix europaea Middend., a synonym of Larix sibirica Ledeb.
