= Coleophora maturella =

Scientific classification
- Kingdom: Animalia
- Phylum: Arthropoda
- Class: Insecta
- Order: Lepidoptera
- Family: Coleophoridae
- Genus: Coleophora
- Species: C. maturella

Binomial name
- Coleophora maturella Pleshanov, 1982

Synonyms
- Protocryptis maturella

Species of moth

Coleophora maturella is a moth of the family Coleophoridae. It is found in Russia.

The larvae feed on the needles of Larix sibirica.
