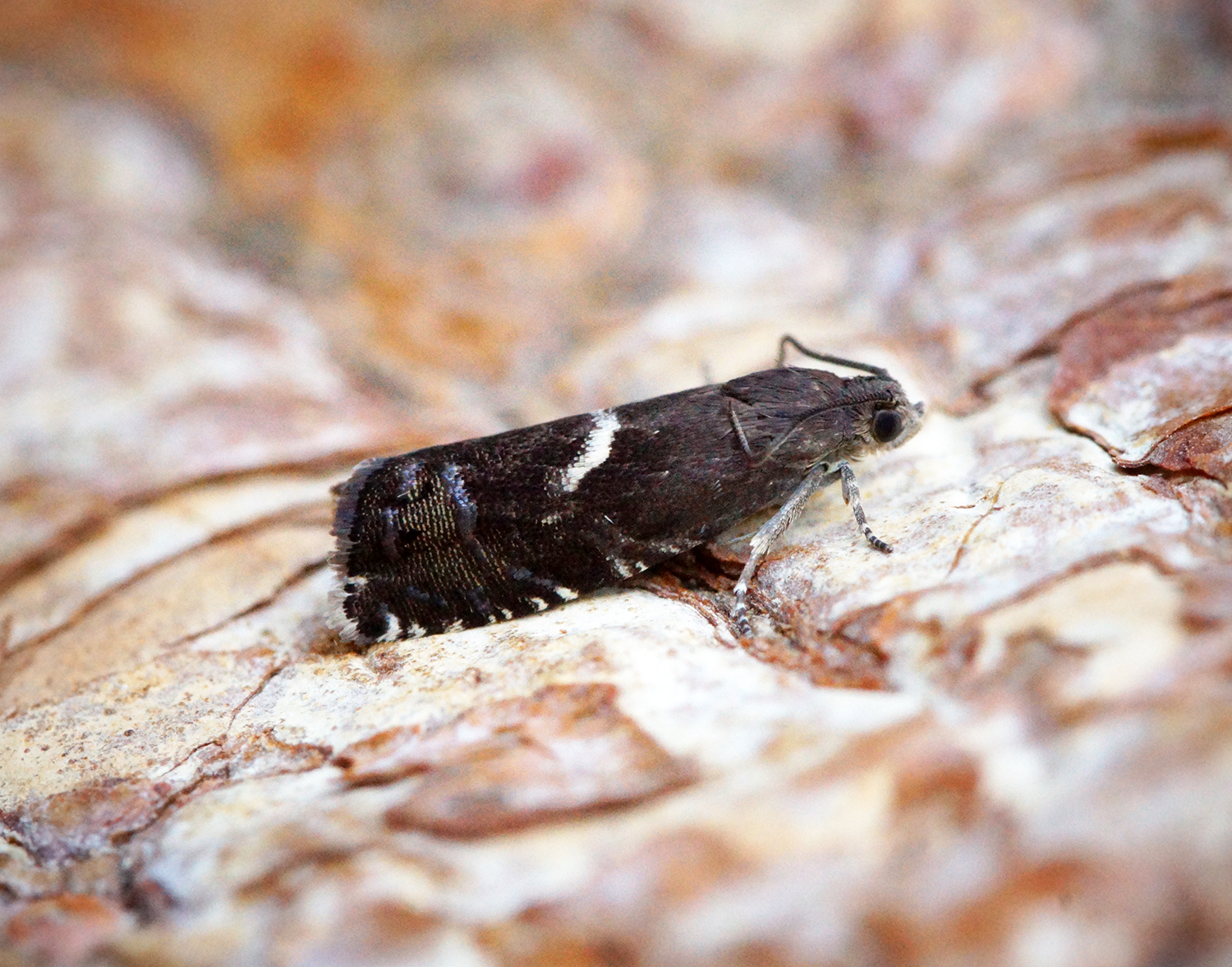

Scientific classification
- Kingdom: Animalia
- Phylum: Arthropoda
- Clade: Pancrustacea
- Class: Insecta
- Order: Lepidoptera
- Family: Tortricidae
- Genus: Cydia
- Species: C. illutana

Binomial name
- Cydia illutana (Herrich-Schäffer, 1851)

Synonyms
- Several, see text

= Cydia illutana =

Species of moth

Cydia illutana is a small moth of the family Tortricidae. It is found from western and central Europe (Great Britain, the Netherlands, Austria, Germany and France), north to Scandinavia (Denmark, Norway, Sweden and Finland) and east to Russia (Siberia).

The wingspan is 12–14 mm. Adults are on wing in May and June. There is one generation per year.

The caterpillars feed on the scales of conifer cones. Host plants are European silver fir (Abies alba), European larch (Larix decidua), Dahurian larch (L. gmelinii), Siberian larch (L. sibirica), Norway spruce (Picea abies), Siberian spruce (P. (a.) obovata) and common Douglas-fir (Pseudotsuga menziesii). They pupate in peat or rotting wood.

== Synonyms ==
Junior synonyms of this species are:

- Laspeyresia ibeeliana Karpinski, 1962
- Laspeyresia illutana (Herrich-Schäffer, 1851)
- Lapseyresia illutana dahuricolana Kuznetzov, 1962
- Tortrix (Grapholitha) illutana Herrich-Schäffer, 1851

In addition, the specific name illutana was used in a list of tortrix moths by G.A.W. Herrich-Schäffer in 1847 already. But he did not provide a description then, thus the scientific name was validly established by him only in 1851.
