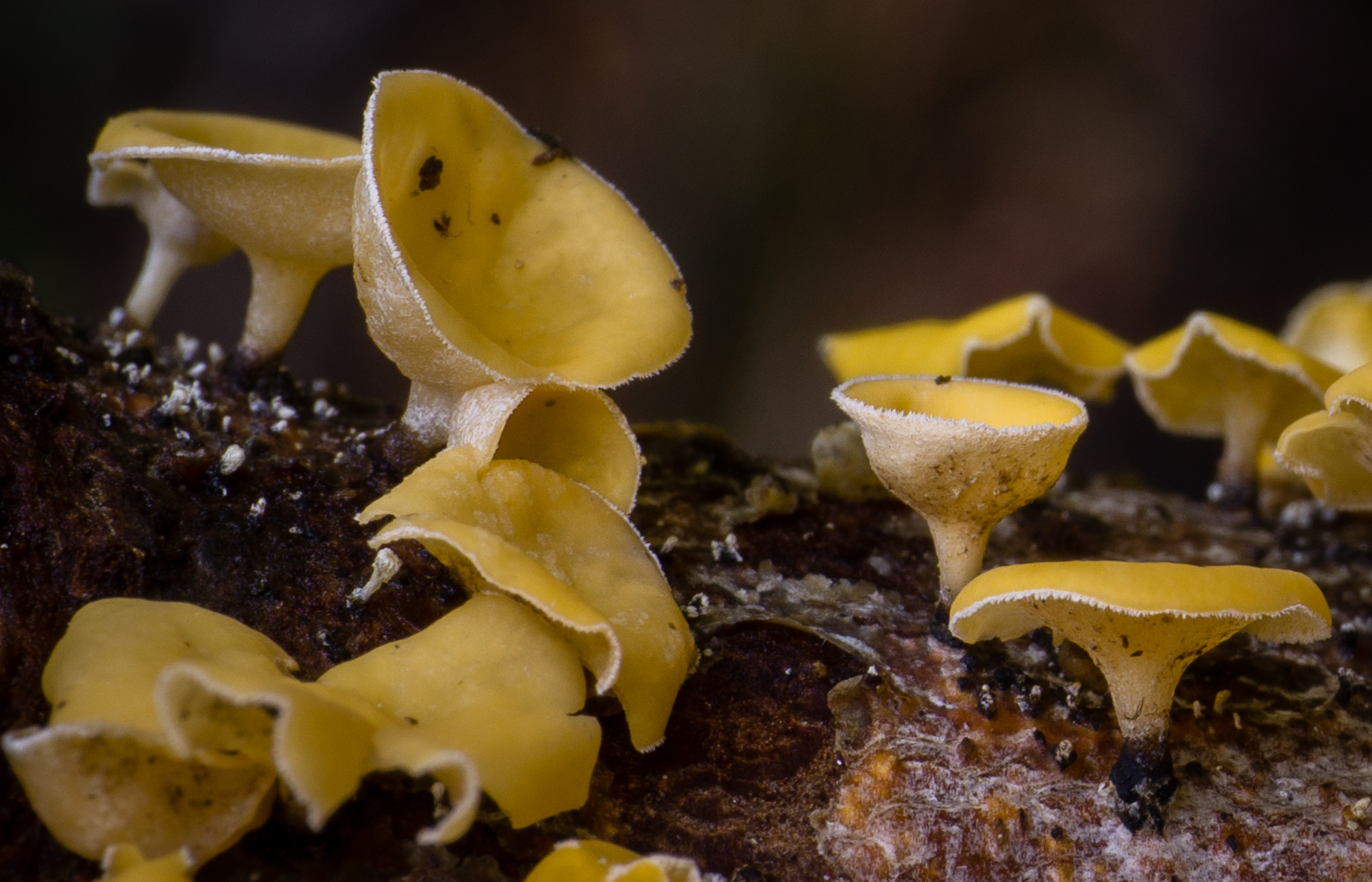
- Lachnellula calyciformis

Scientific classification
- Kingdom: Fungi
- Division: Ascomycota
- Class: Leotiomycetes
- Order: Helotiales
- Family: Lachnaceae
- Genus: Lachnellula; P.Karst. (1884)

Type species
- Lachnellula chrysophthalma (Pers.) P.Karst. (1884)

Species
- See text

Synonyms
- Trichoscypha Boud. (1885); Trichoscyphella Nannf. (1932)

= Lachnellula =

Genus of fungi

Lachnellula is a genus of fungi in the family Lachnaceae. The genus contains 40 species. Lachnellula was circumscribed in 1884 by Petter Karsten, with Lachnellula chrysophthalma assigned as the type species.

Many species are associated with canker disease on various conifers, including Lachnellula willkommii, which causes the feared disease of larch canker to some larch trees.

== Species ==
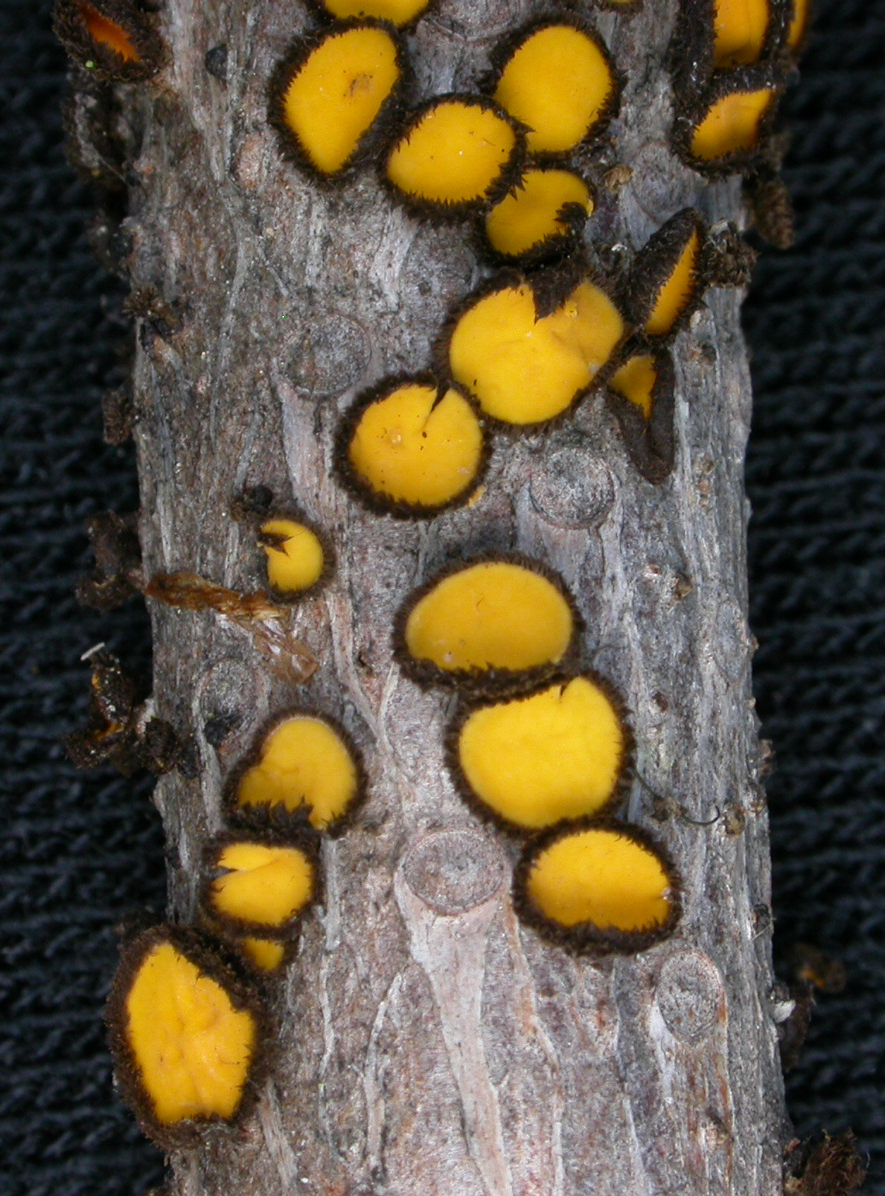
Lachnellula arida

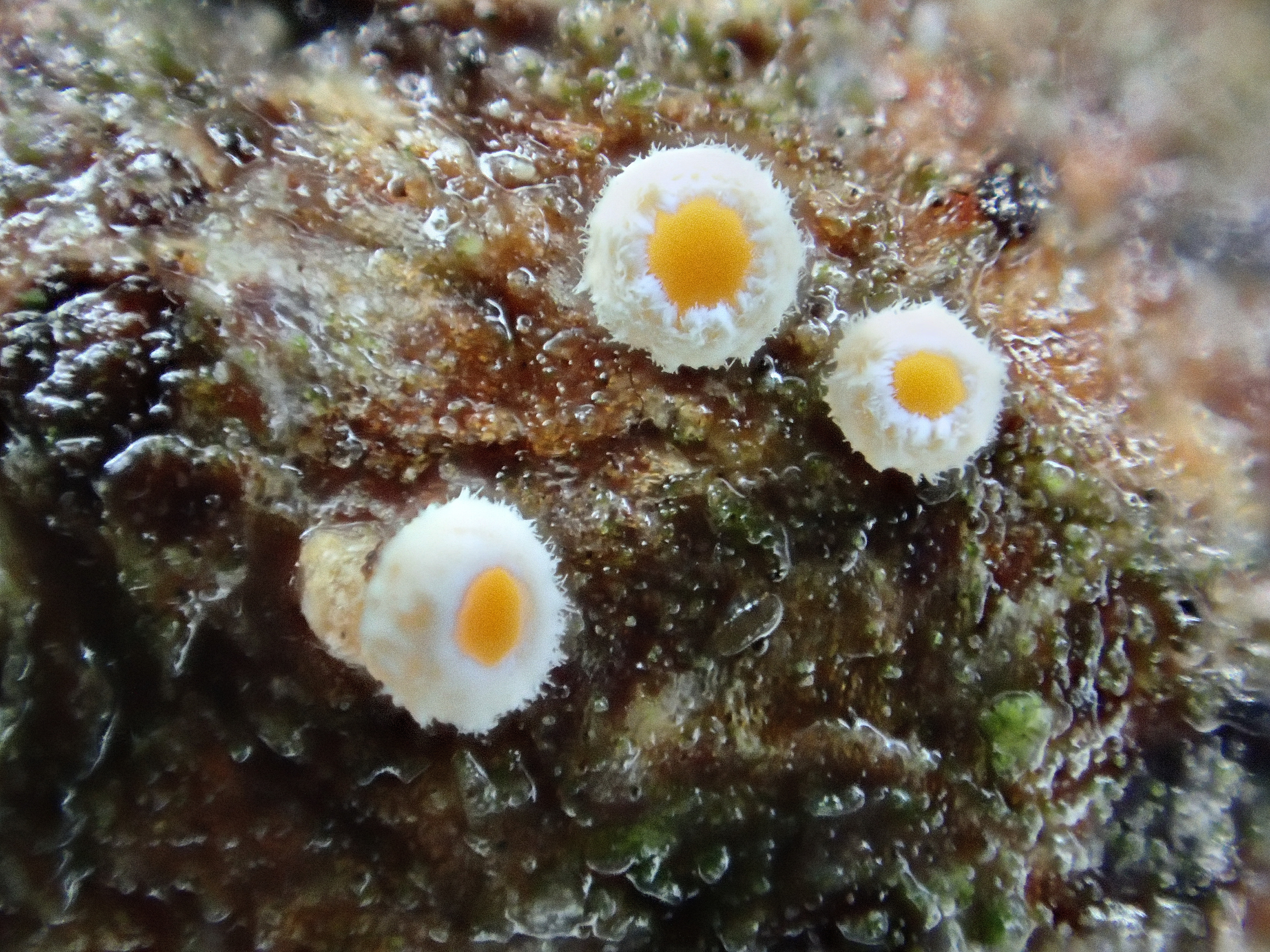
Lachnellula occidentalis

- Lachnellula abietis (P.Karst.) Dennis (1962)
- Lachnellula aeruginosa Oguchi (1980)
- Lachnellula agassizii (Berk. & M.A.Curtis) Dennis (1962)
- Lachnellula angustispora Raitv. (1977)
- Lachnellula arida (W.Phillips) Dennis (1962)
- Lachnellula bruneiensis Whitton, K.D.Hyde & McKenzie (2012)
- Lachnellula calva Rick (1906)
- Lachnellula calyciformis (Batsch) Dharne (1965)
- Lachnellula calycina (Schumach.) Sacc. (1889)
- Lachnellula cervina (Ellis & Everh.) Dennis (1963)
- Lachnellula chrysophthalma (Pers.) P. Karst. (1884)
- Lachnellula ciliata Dennis (1962)
- Lachnellula cyphelloides (Ellis & Everh.) Sacc. (1889)
- Lachnellula dabaensis W.Y.Zhuang (1997)
- Lachnellula ellisiana (Rehm) Baral (2018)
- Lachnellula eucalypti Spooner (1987)
- Lachnellula flavovirens (Bres.) Dennis (1962)
- Lachnellula fuckelii (Bres. ex Rehm) Dharne (1965)
- Lachnellula fuscosanguinea (Rehm) Dennis (1962)
- Lachnellula himalayensis A.K.Kar & K.P.Pal (1970)
- Lachnellula hyalina Dharne (1965)
- Lachnellula ikenoi Henn. (1902)
- Lachnellula intricata Spooner (1987)
- Lachnellula juniperina (K.Holm & L.Holm) Vesterh. (1996)
- Lachnellula kamtschatica Raitv. (1970)
- Lachnellula laricis (Rehm) Dharne (1965)
- Lachnellula minuscula Raitv. (1977)
- Lachnellula minuta Dharne (1965)
- Lachnellula occidentalis (G.G.Hahn & Ayers) Dharne (1965)
- Lachnellula pittospori L.M.Kohn (1980)
- Lachnellula populina (Seaver) Pärtel & Baral (2020)
- Lachnellula pseudofarinacea (P.Crouan & H.Crouan) Dennis (1962)
- Lachnellula pseudotsugae (G.G.Hahn) Dennis (1962)
- Lachnellula pulverulenta (Lib.) Sasagawa & Hosoya (2010)
- Lachnellula rattanicola J.Fröhl. & K.D.Hyde (2000)
- Lachnellula rehmii Ferd. & C.A.Jørg. (1938)
- Lachnellula resinaria (Cooke & W.Phillips) Rehm (1893)
- Lachnellula rhopalostylidis (Dennis) Korf (1977)
- Lachnellula robusta Baral & Matheis (1984)
- Lachnellula schumannii Rehm (1893)
- Lachnellula splendens (J.Schröt.) Baral & Matheis (2000)
- Lachnellula subtilissima (Cooke) Dennis (1962)
- Lachnellula succina (Sacc.) Polhorský & Baral (2020)
- Lachnellula suecica (de Bary ex Fuckel) Nannf. (1953)
- Lachnellula tuberculata Dharne (1965)
- Lachnellula viridiglauca L.M.Kohn (1981)
- Lachnellula willkommii (R.Hartig) Dennis (1962)
