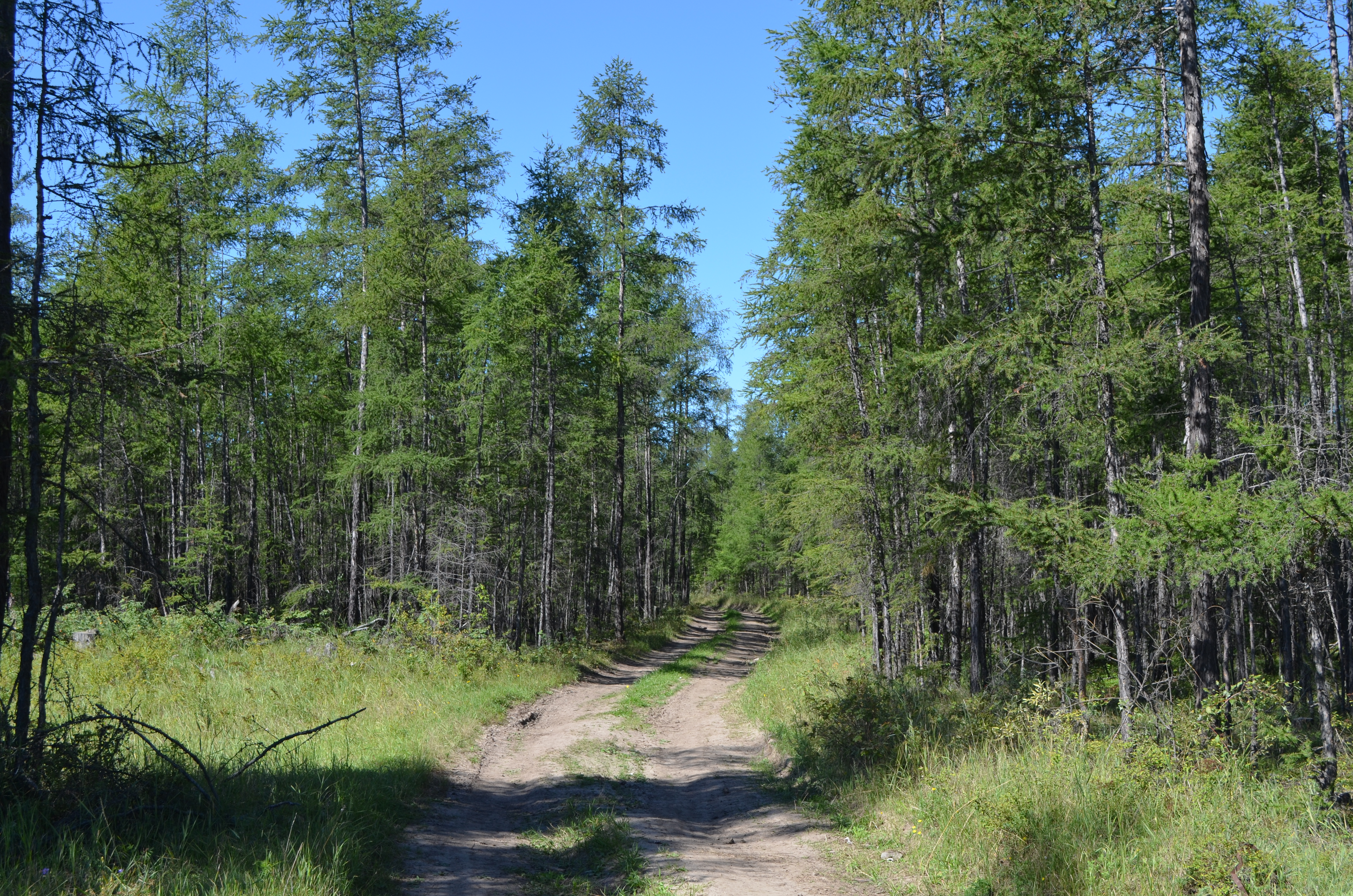
- Dahurian larch forest in summer, Yakutsk area, northeast Siberia

Conservation status
- Least Concern (IUCN 3.1)

Scientific classification
- Kingdom: Plantae
- Clade: Tracheophytes
- Clade: Gymnosperms
- Division: Pinophyta
- Class: Pinopsida
- Order: Pinales
- Family: Pinaceae
- Genus: Larix
- Species: L. gmelinii

Binomial name
- Larix gmelinii (Rupr.) Rupr.

= Larix gmelinii =

Dahurian larch Larix gmelinii

Species of conifer

Larix gmelinii, the Dahurian larch or East Siberian larch, is a species of larch native to eastern Siberia and adjacent northeastern Mongolia, northeastern China (Heilongjiang), and the Korean Peninsula.

== Description ==
Larix gmelinii is a medium-sized deciduous coniferous tree reaching 10–30 m tall, rarely 40 m, with a trunk up to 1 m diameter. The crown is broad conic; both the main branches and the side branches are level, the side branches only rarely drooping. The shoots are dimorphic, with growth divided into long shoots (typically 5–30 cm long) and bearing several buds, and short shoots only 1–2 mm long with only a single bud. The leaves are needle-like, light green, 2–3 cm long; they turn bright yellow to orange before they fall in the autumn, leaving the variably downy reddish-brown shoots bare until the next spring.

The cones are erect, ovoid, 1–2 cm (rarely to 2.5 cm; but 2–4 cm in var. principis-rupprechtii) long, with 15–25 moderately reflexed seed scales (26–45 scales in var. principis-rupprechtii); they are green or red (rarely purple) when immature, turning brown and opening to release the seeds when mature, 3–5 months after pollination. The old cones commonly remain on the tree for many years, turning dull grey-black.

== Taxonomy and systematics ==
The scientific name honours Johann Georg Gmelin. Due to the species' variability, it has acquired numerous synonyms in the botanical literature, including L. cajanderi, L. dahurica, L. kamtschatica, L. komarovii, L. kurilensis, L. lubarskii, L. ochotensis.

Dahurian larch intergrades with the closely related Siberian larch L. sibirica of central and western Siberia where their ranges meet along the Yenisei Valley; the resulting hybrid is named Larix × czekanowskii. In cultivation, it has also been hybridised artificially by controlled pollination with European larch L. decidua and Japanese larch L. kaempferi.

=== Varieties ===
As of April 2022, Plants of the World Online accepts four varieties:

- Larix gmelinii var. gmelinii. Most of the species' range, from the Yenisei Valley east to Kamchatka.
- Larix gmelinii var. japonica. The Kuril Islands and Sakhalin.
- Larix gmelinii var. olgensis. North Korea, Heilongjiang, and the Sikhote-Alin mountains of Primorsky Krai, Russia. Sometimes treated as a distinct species Larix olgensis.
- Larix gmelinii var. principis-rupprechtii (Prince Rupprecht's larch). Often treated as a distinct species Larix principis-rupprechtii. It occurs in a disjunct region in the Wutai Shan mountains west of Beijing, separated from typical L. gmelinii by about 1000 km, and differs in having larger (2–4 cm) cones with more scales.

== Ecology and uses ==
Larix gmelinii forms enormous forests in the eastern Siberian taiga, growing at 50–1,200 m altitude on both boggy and well-drained soils, including on the shallow soils above permafrost. It is unique in two respects, being the northernmost tree in the world, reaching 73° 04' 32" N 102° E as creeping forms of the trees in the tundra of the Taymyr Peninsula, 72° 55' 07" N 106° 08' E, and as comparatively vertical growing single trees and small groups of trees, 72° 31' N 105° 03' E at the Lukunsky grove and 72° 28' N 102° 15' E at Ary-Mas as the subtundra sparse forests which are situated both in the Taymyr Peninsula, Khatanga river basin, and also the most cold-hardy tree in the world, tolerating temperatures below -70 °C in the Oymyakon–Verkhoyansk region of Yakutia. One tree in Yakutia was recorded as being 919 years old.

Dahurian larch is occasionally grown in botanical gardens in Europe and North America; it is not an easy tree to grow in areas with mild winters as it is adapted to a long period of winter rest; the warm winter weather in Britain can tempt it into leaf as early as the start of January, with the tender young leaves then being killed by the next frost. In its native region, daily minimum temperatures above freezing do not occur until late May or June, with no further frost until the brief summer is over.

Larix gmelinii cone scales are used as food by the caterpillars of the tortrix moth Cydia illutana.

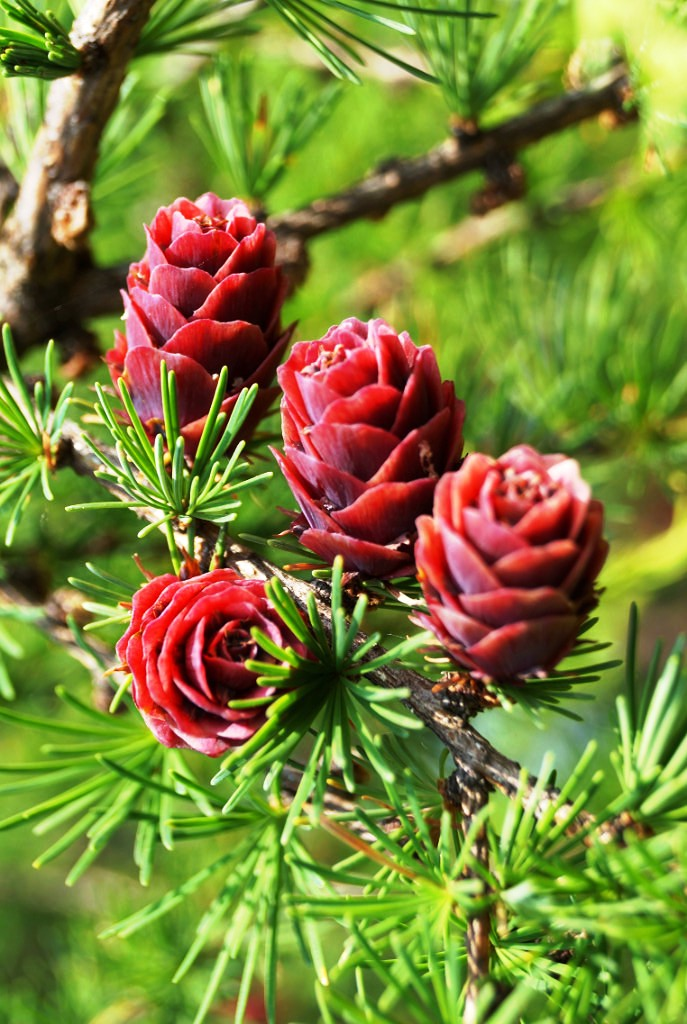
Leaves and immature cones; Sikhote Alin

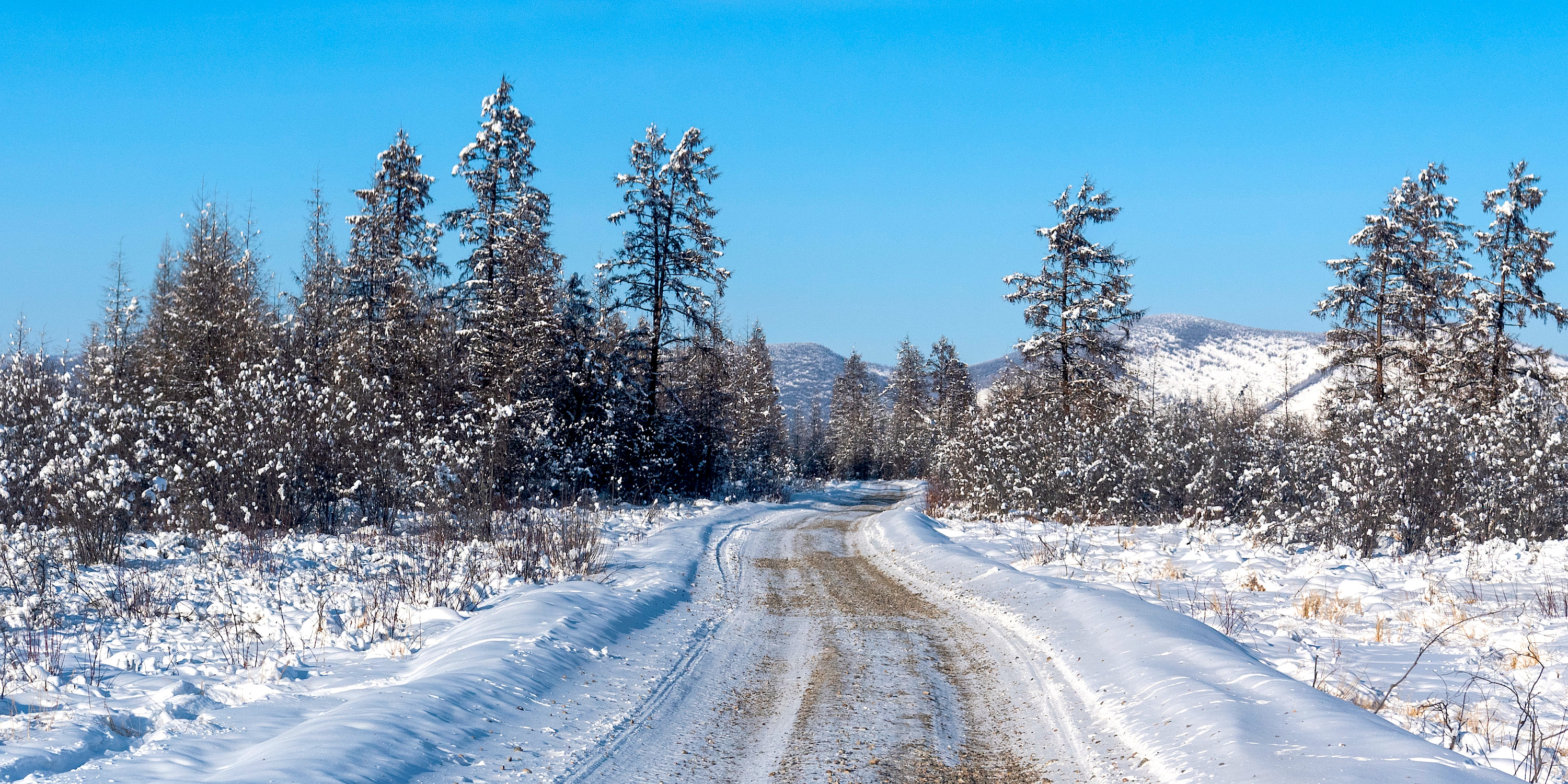
Trees in winter at Oymyakon

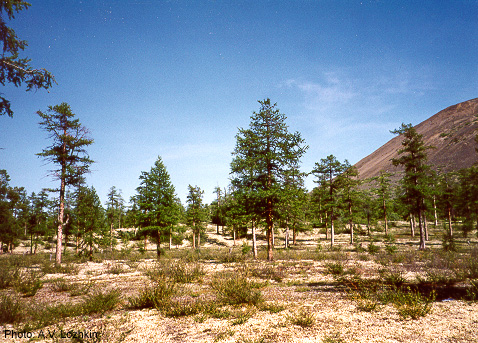
Forest in the Kolyma region, arctic northeast Siberia
