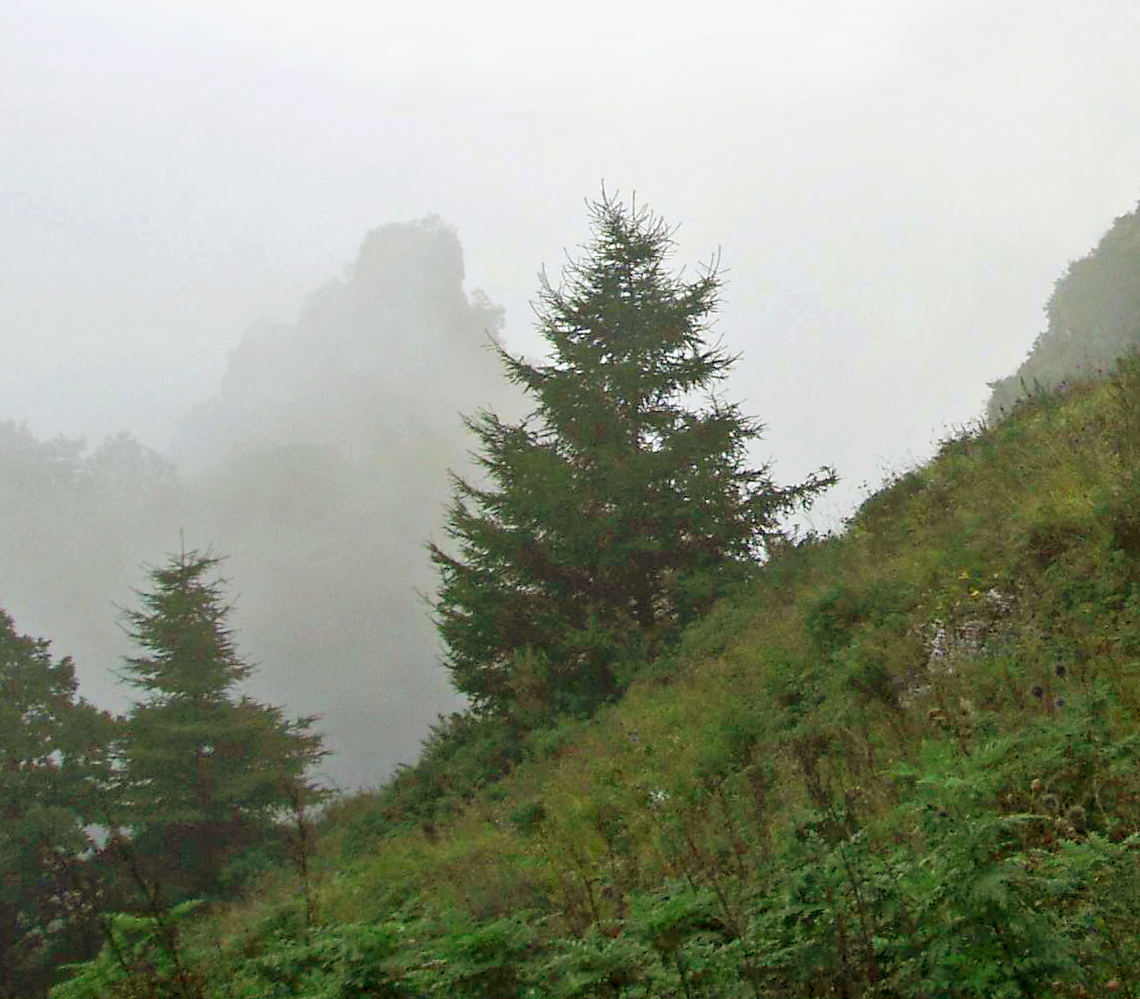
- Trees in the Taihang Mountains, Hebei province, China

Scientific classification
- Kingdom: Plantae
- Clade: Tracheophytes
- Clade: Gymnospermae
- Division: Pinophyta
- Class: Pinopsida
- Order: Pinales
- Family: Pinaceae
- Genus: Larix
- Species: L. gmelinii
- Variety: L. g. var. principis-rupprechtii

Trinomial name
- Larix gmelinii var. principis-rupprechtii (Mayr) Pilg.

Synonyms
- Larix principis-rupprechtii Mayr (basionym); Larix dahurica var. principis-rupprechtii (Mayr) Rehder & E.H.Wilson; Larix gmelinii subsp. principis-rupprechtii (Mayr) A.E.Murray; Larix principis-rupprechtii var. wulingschanensis (Liou & Q.L.Wang) Kitag.; Larix wulingschanensis Liou & Q.L.Wang

= Larix gmelinii var. principis-rupprechtii =

Variety of conifer

Larix gmelinii var. principis-rupprechtii, synonym Larix principis-rupprechtii, Prince Rupprecht's larch, is a variety of conifer in the larch genus Larix. It is native to altitudes of 1400–2800 m in the Wutai Shan mountains west of Beijing in the northern Chinese provinces of Shanxi and Hebei, separated from typical L. gmelinii by about 1000 km. It is named after Prince Rupprecht of Bavaria, who funded Mayr's work.

It is a tree growing to 30–35 m tall, with grey-brown bark. Like other larches, the leaves are deciduous; they are up to 3.5 cm long. The cones are ovoid, 2–4 cm long, with 26–45 scales, significantly larger than typical L. gmelinii (cones 1–2 cm, rarely 3 cm, long, with 14–30 scales).

== Taxonomy ==
Its status is disputed; it is accepted as a distinct species by Rushforth and many Chinese botanists; but treated as a variety of L. gmelinii by POWO and Farjon despite its disjunct distribution and substantially larger cones with more scales. It is also less cold-tolerant than L. gmelinii, being rated at USDA hardiness zone 4, rather than the zone 0–1 of typical L. gmelinii, and is also less tolerant of wet soils.

It has been hybridised in cultivation with Japanese larch; the hybrids showing marked heterosis with faster growth than either parent.
