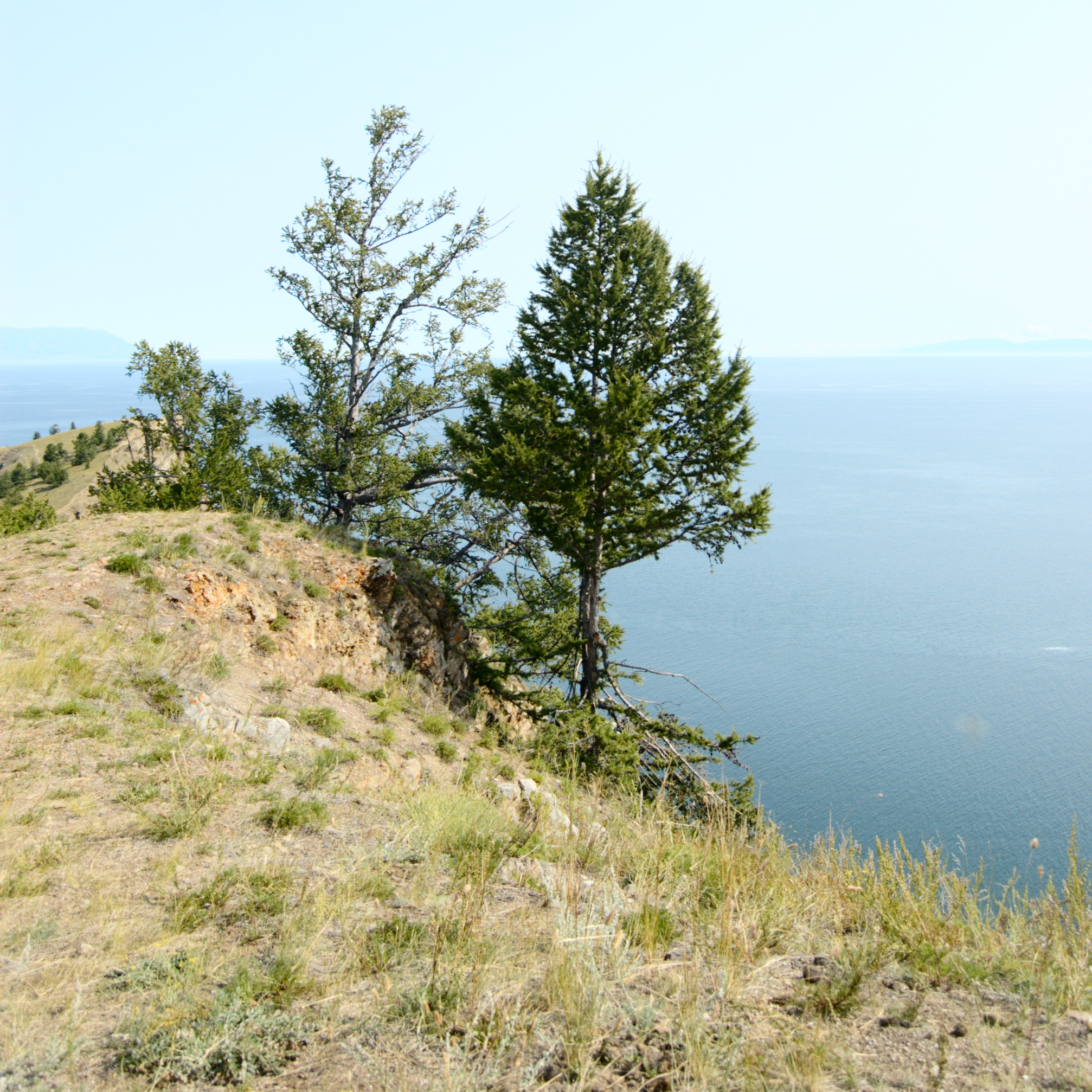

Conservation status
- Least Concern (IUCN 2.3)

Scientific classification
- Kingdom: Plantae
- Clade: Tracheophytes
- Clade: Gymnosperms
- Division: Pinophyta
- Class: Pinopsida
- Order: Pinales
- Family: Pinaceae
- Genus: Larix
- Species: L. × czekanowskii

Binomial name
- Larix × czekanowskii Szafer

= Larix × czekanowskii =

Species of conifer

Larix × czekanowskii is a larch species, a natural hybrid between Siberian larch (Larix sibirica) and Dahurian larch (Larix gmelinii).

== Description ==
Larix × czekanowskii occurs where their ranges meet in central Siberia. It is intermediate between its parent species in all characters.
