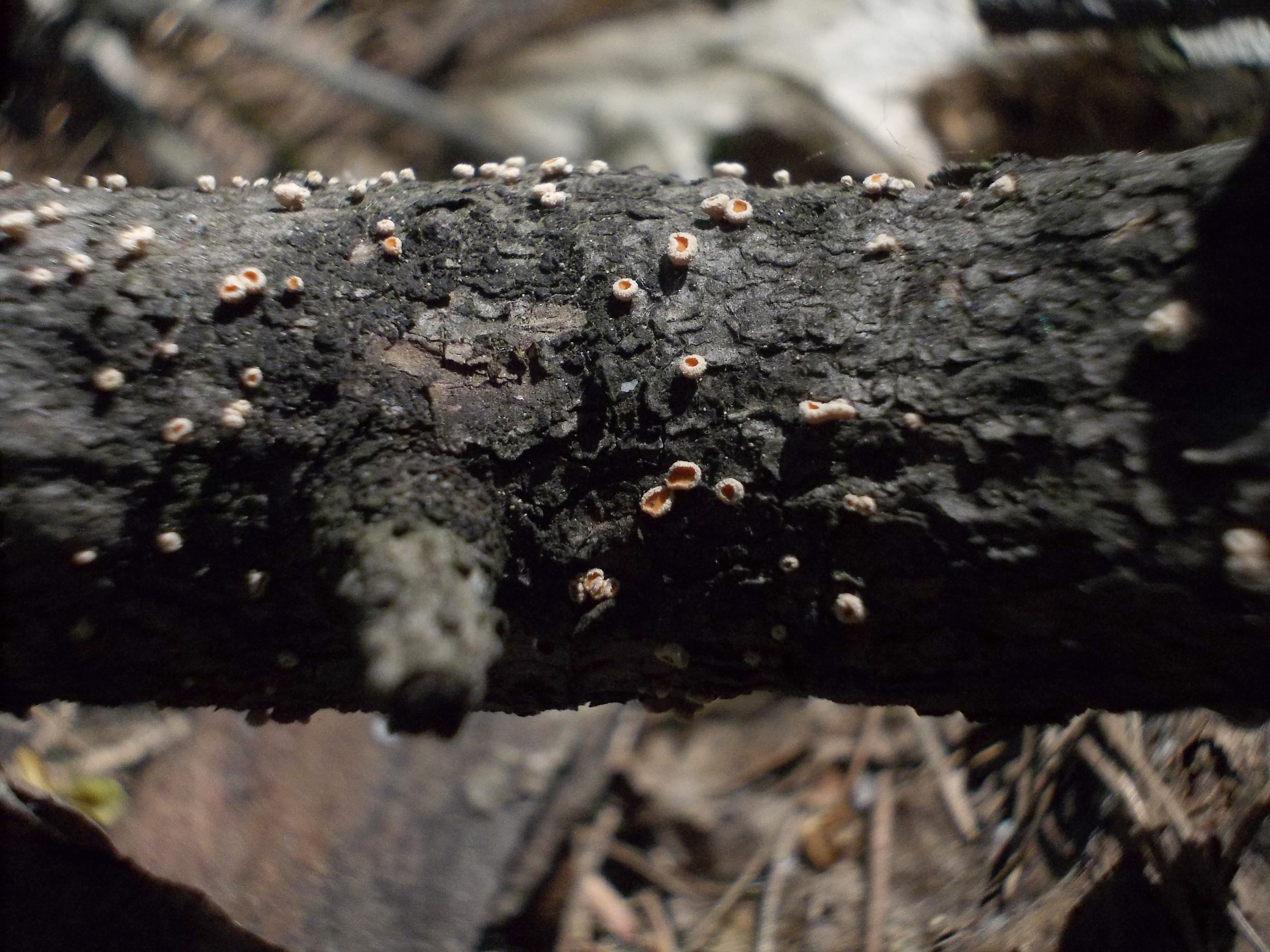

Scientific classification
- Kingdom: Fungi
- Division: Ascomycota
- Class: Leotiomycetes
- Order: Helotiales
- Family: Lachnaceae
- Genus: Lachnellula
- Species: L. willkommii

Binomial name
- Lachnellula willkommii (Hartig) Dennis, 1962

= Lachnellula willkommii =

Species of fungus

Lachnellula willkommii is a species of fungus belonging to the family Lachnaceae.

It is native to Eurasia and Northern America.
