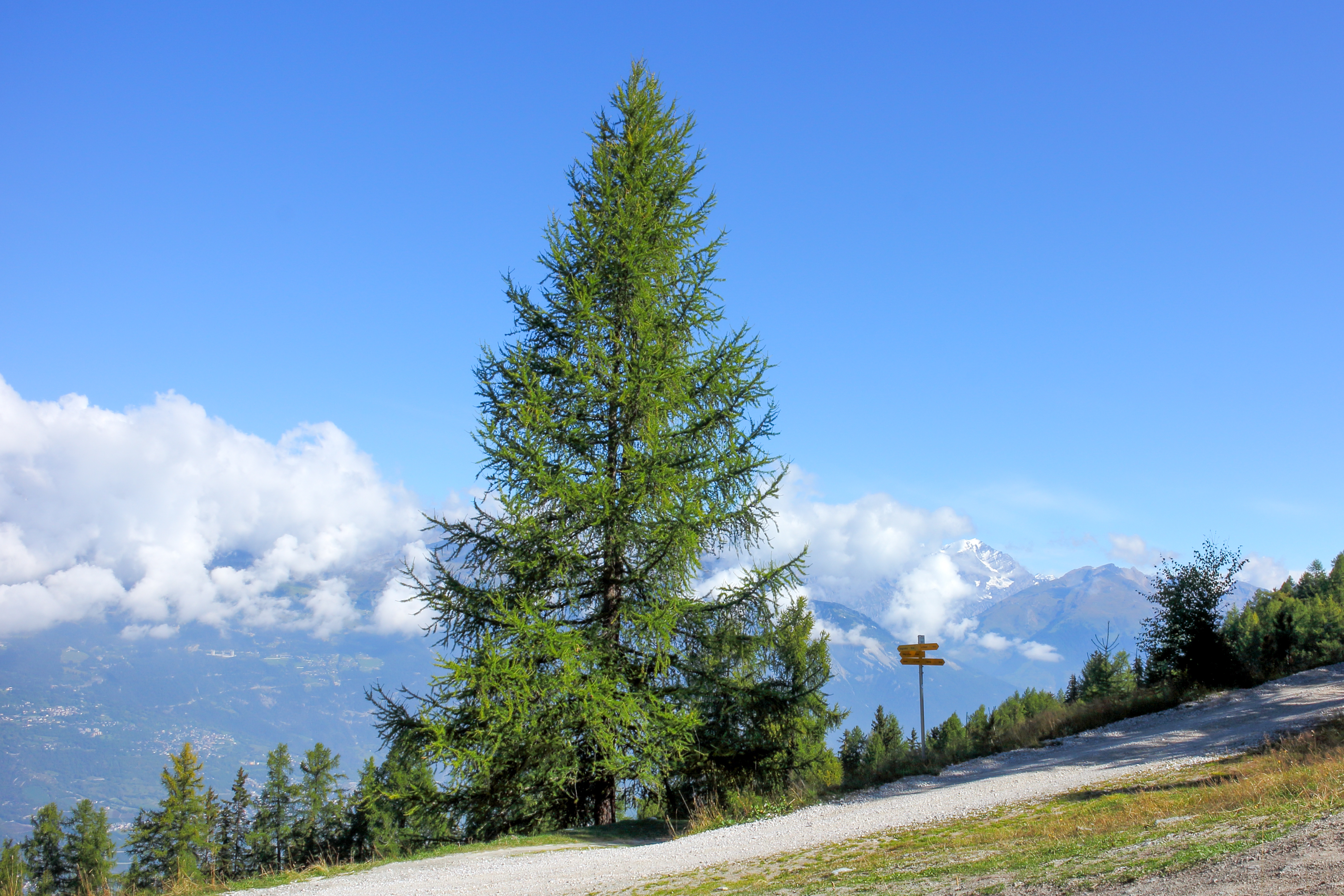
- European larch in l'A Bran, (1798 m) Val d'Annivier

Conservation status
- Least Concern (IUCN 3.1)

- Secure (NatureServe)

Scientific classification
- Kingdom: Plantae
- Clade: Tracheophytes
- Clade: Gymnosperms
- Division: Pinophyta
- Class: Pinopsida
- Order: Pinales
- Family: Pinaceae
- Genus: Larix
- Species: L. decidua

Binomial name
- Larix decidua Mill.
- Continuous range (var. decidua) Continuous range ✖ Isolated population (var. carpatica) ✖ Isolated population (subsp. polonica)

Synonyms
- List: Abies larix (L.) J.St.-Hil.; Larix caducifolia Gilib.; Larix europaea DC.; Larix excelsa Link; Larix gracilis A.Dietr.; Larix larix (L.) H.Karst.; Larix pyramidalis Salisb.; Larix sudetica Domin; Larix vulgaris Fisch. ex Spach; Peuce larix (L.) Rich.; Picea larix (L.) Peterm.; Pinus laeta Salisb.; Pinus larix L.

= Larix decidua =

European larch

Species of tree in the pine family

Larix decidua, the European larch, is a species of larch native to the mountains of central Europe, in the Alps and Carpathian Mountains, with small disjunct lowland populations in northern Poland. Its life span has been confirmed to be close to 1000 years, with ages of around 2000 years likely.

== Description ==
Larix decidua is a medium-size to large deciduous coniferous tree reaching 25–45 metres (82–148 ft) tall, with a trunk up to 1.5 metres (5 ft) diameter (exceptionally, to 53.8 metres (176 ft 6 in) and 11.20 m girth (3.56 m diameter). The crown is conic when young, becoming broad and often irregular with age; the main branches are level to upswept, with the side branches often pendulous. The shoots are dimorphic, with growth divided into long shoots (typically 10–50 cm (4–20 in) long) and bearing several buds, and short shoots only 1–2 mm long with only a single bud. The leaves are needle-like, light green, 2–4 centimetres (3/4–1 5/8 in) long which turn bright yellow before they fall in the autumn, leaving the pale yellow-buff shoots bare until the next spring.

The cones are erect, ovoid-conic, 2–6 centimetres (3/4–2 3/8 in) long, with 10-90 erect or slightly incurved (not reflexed) seed scales; they are bright pinkish-red at pollination, then green variably flushed red to purplish when immature, and turn brown and opening to release the seeds when mature, 4–6 months after pollination. The old cones commonly remain on the tree for many years, turning dull grey-black.

It is very cold tolerant, able to survive winter temperatures down to at least −50 °C (−58 °F), and is among the tree line trees in the Alps, reaching 2,400 m (7,900 ft) altitude, though most abundant from 1,000–2,000 m (3,300–6,600 ft). It only grows on well-drained soils, avoiding waterlogged ground and is not shade tolerant.

It is closely related to Siberian larch Larix sibirica and similar in morphology; the two are best distinguished by the dense pubescence on the cone scales of L. sibirica, compared to the glabrous or only thinly pubescent cone scales of L. decidua.

== Subtaxa ==
The following varieties are accepted by Plants of the World Online:

- Larix decidua var. decidua – European larch or Alpine larch. Most of the range, except as below. Cones 2.5–6 cm; shoots yellow-buff.
- Larix decidua var. carpatica Domin – Carpathian larch. In the Carpathian Mountains. Differs little from nominate var. decidua.
- Larix decidua var. polonica (Racib. ex Wóycicki) Ostenf. & Syrach – Polish larch. Disjunct in lowland northern and central Poland. Cones 2–3 cm; shoots very pale yellow-buff, almost white.

The Polish larch, being disjunct and growing in a different lowland habitat with a more continental rather than montane sub-oceanic climate, is widely treated at the higher rank of subspecies rather than variety, Larix decidua subsp. polonica (Racib. ex Wóycicki) Domin. The Russian botanist Evgenij Bobrov considered it to be an ancient natural hybrid between European larch and Siberian larch L. sibirica, but this has been shown to be incorrect, with it derived from only L. decidua.

== Ecology ==
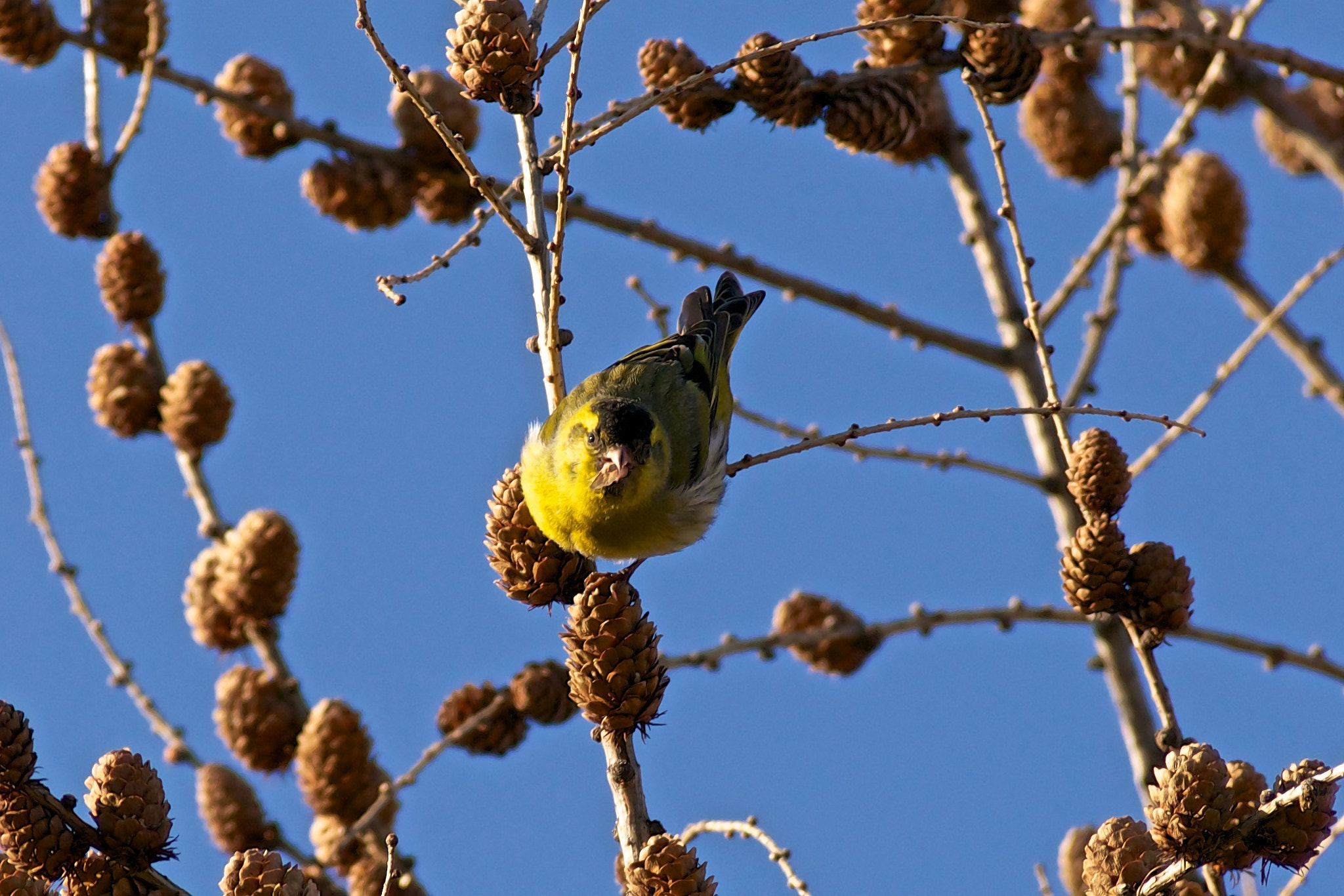
A siskin eating a European larch seed

The seeds are an important food for some birds, notably siskin, redpoll, and citril finch, while the buds and immature cones are eaten by capercaillie.

Larch needles (including L. decidua and L. sibirica) are the only known food for caterpillars of the case-bearer moth Coleophora sibiricella; its cone scales are used as food by the caterpillars of the tortrix moth Cydia illutana.

It is susceptible to larch canker Lachnellula willkommii.

== Cultivation ==
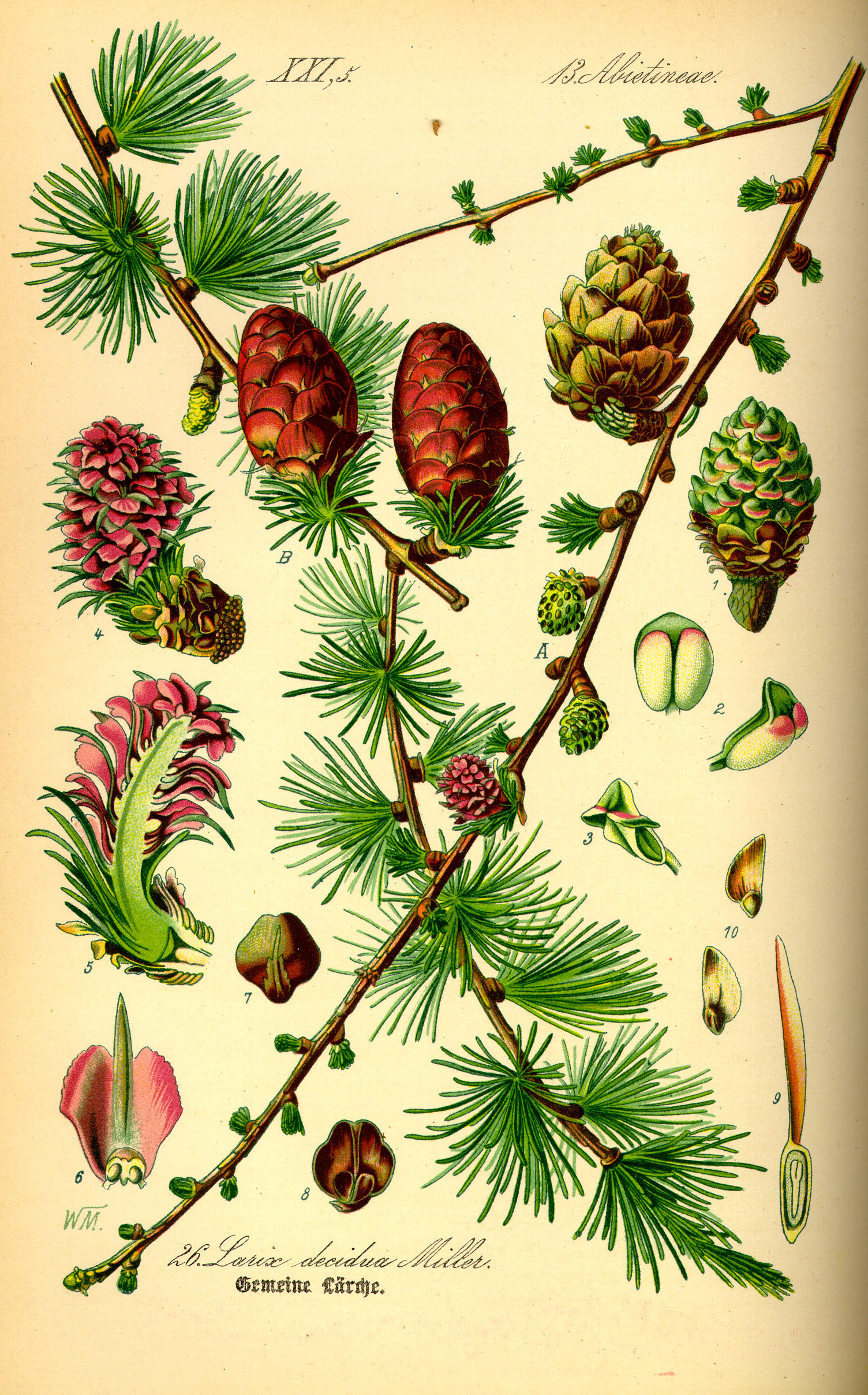
European larch morphology features from book: Prof. Dr. Otto Wilhelm Thomé Flora von Deutschland, Österreich und der Schweiz, 1885, Gera, Germany

Larix decidua is widely cultivated as an ornamental tree for planting in gardens and parks. It was first cultivated in Britain in or shortly before 1629. John Evelyn encouraged its wider planting and use. Three successive Dukes of Atholl planted it widely and the fourth Duke wrote "Observations on Larch" in 1807 further encouraged its cultivation, which he practiced on a large scale. One of the larches planted by the second Duke of Atholl at Dunkeld in 1737 is still standing, as are two slightly older specimens planted in 1725 at Kailzie, near Peebles in southern Scotland.

European larch is now widely naturalised in northern Europe, including Britain, Scandinavia, and in Germany north of its native range. It is also widely cultivated in southern Canada and the northeastern United States, and is naturalised in Maine, Michigan, New York, Pennsylvania, Connecticut, New Hampshire, Vermont, and Rhode Island. In the northern Appalachian Mountains it is often used for the reforestation of surface mines. European larch can grow on drier soils and tolerate warmer climates than tamarack (Larix laricina) or Siberian larch (Larix sibirica), being better suited to non-boreal climates.

=== Hybrids ===
European larch readily hybridises with Japanese larch L. kaempferi when the two are planted together; the hybrid, named Dunkeld larch or hybrid larch (Larix × marschlinsii Coaz, syn. L. × eurolepis), is extensively used in forestry, and is also naturalised in Britain, Ireland, and elsewhere. It is faster-growing than either parent, and more resistant to larch canker Lachnellula willkommii. Hybrids with several other larches have been made, but are rare; the hybrid with Larix laricina has also been named, as Larix × pendula (Solander) Salisbury.

=== Bonsai ===
The European larch is a popular bonsai species, with many unique specimens available in European circles, and is popularly used in bonsai forest groups.

=== Invasive species ===
In New Zealand, Larix decidua is classed as a wilding conifer, an invasive species which spreads into the high country, where it had been planted by the New Zealand Forest Service for erosion control.

=== Uses ===
The wood is tough and durable, but also flexible in thin strips, and is particularly valued for yacht building; wood used for this, known as 'boatskin larch', must be free of knots, and can only be obtained from old trees that were pruned when young to remove side branches. Small larch poles are widely used for rustic fencing.

Because of its fast juvenile growth and its pioneer character, larch has found numerous applications in forestry and agroforestry. It is used as a 'preparatory species' to afforest open land, abandoned farmland or disturbed land, and as a 'nurse species' prior to the introduction of more demanding species.

== Gallery ==
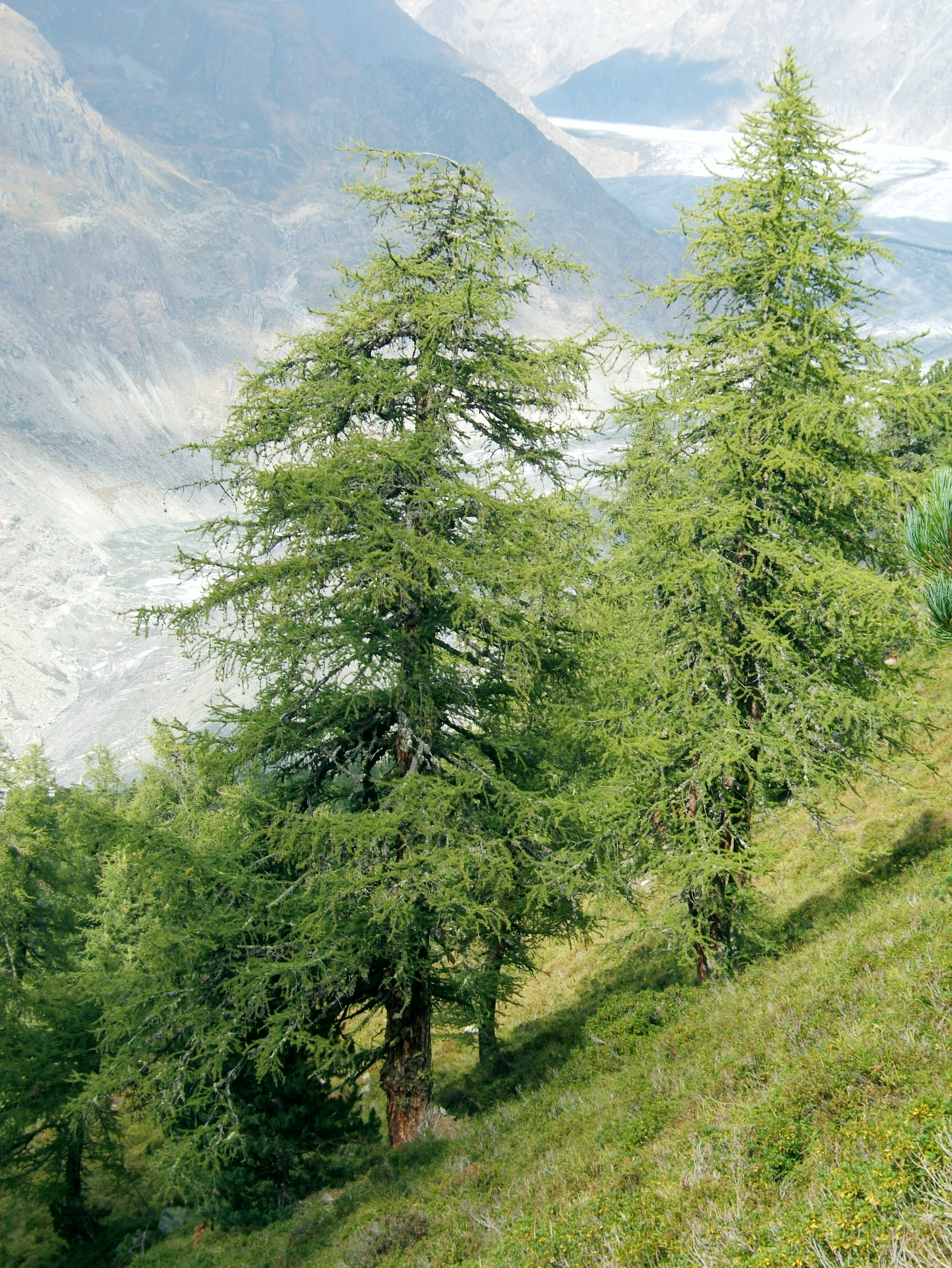
Larix decidua subsp. decidua at Aletschwald, Switzerland

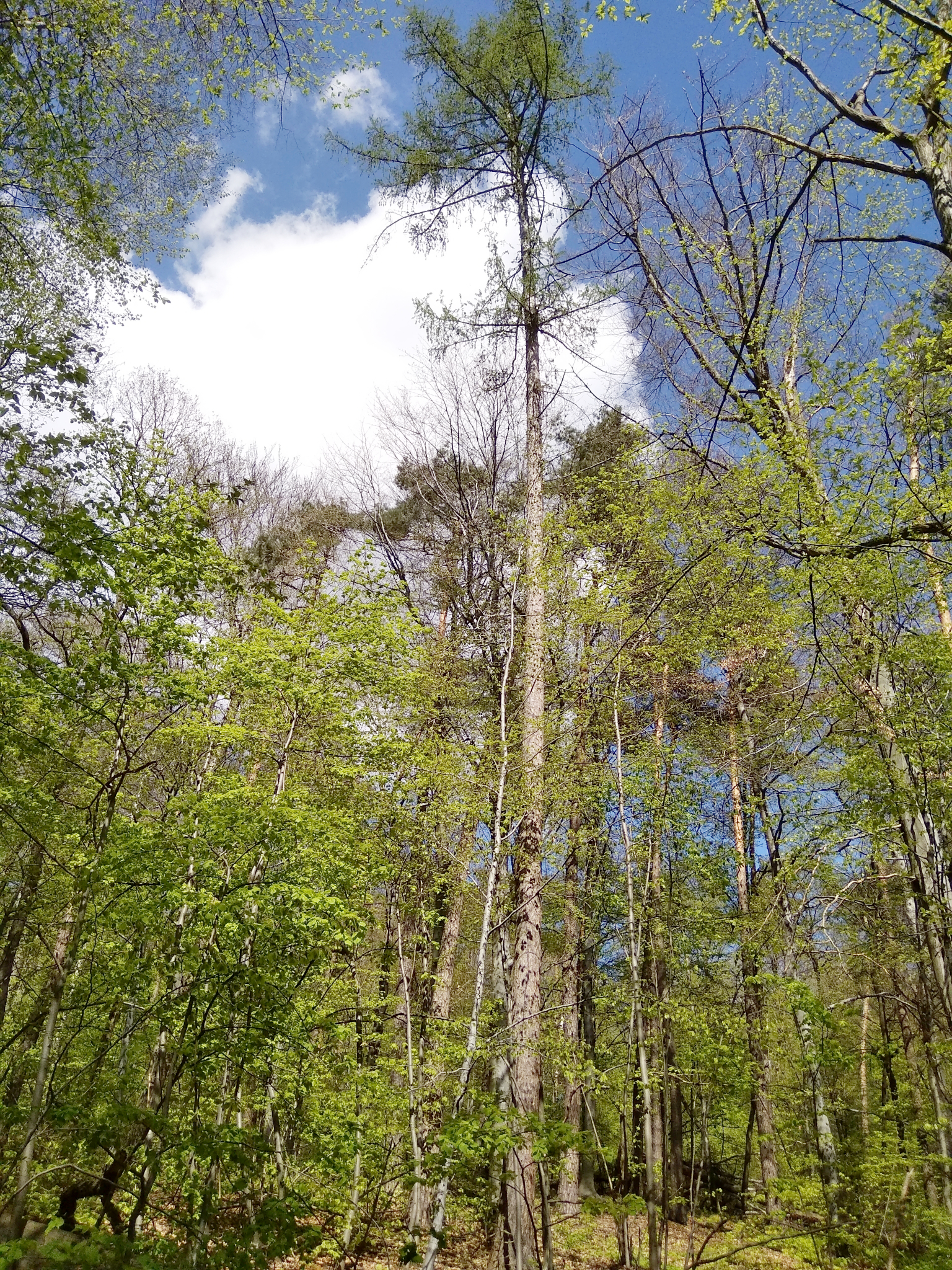
Larix decidua subsp. polonica at Gajówka, Kraków, Poland

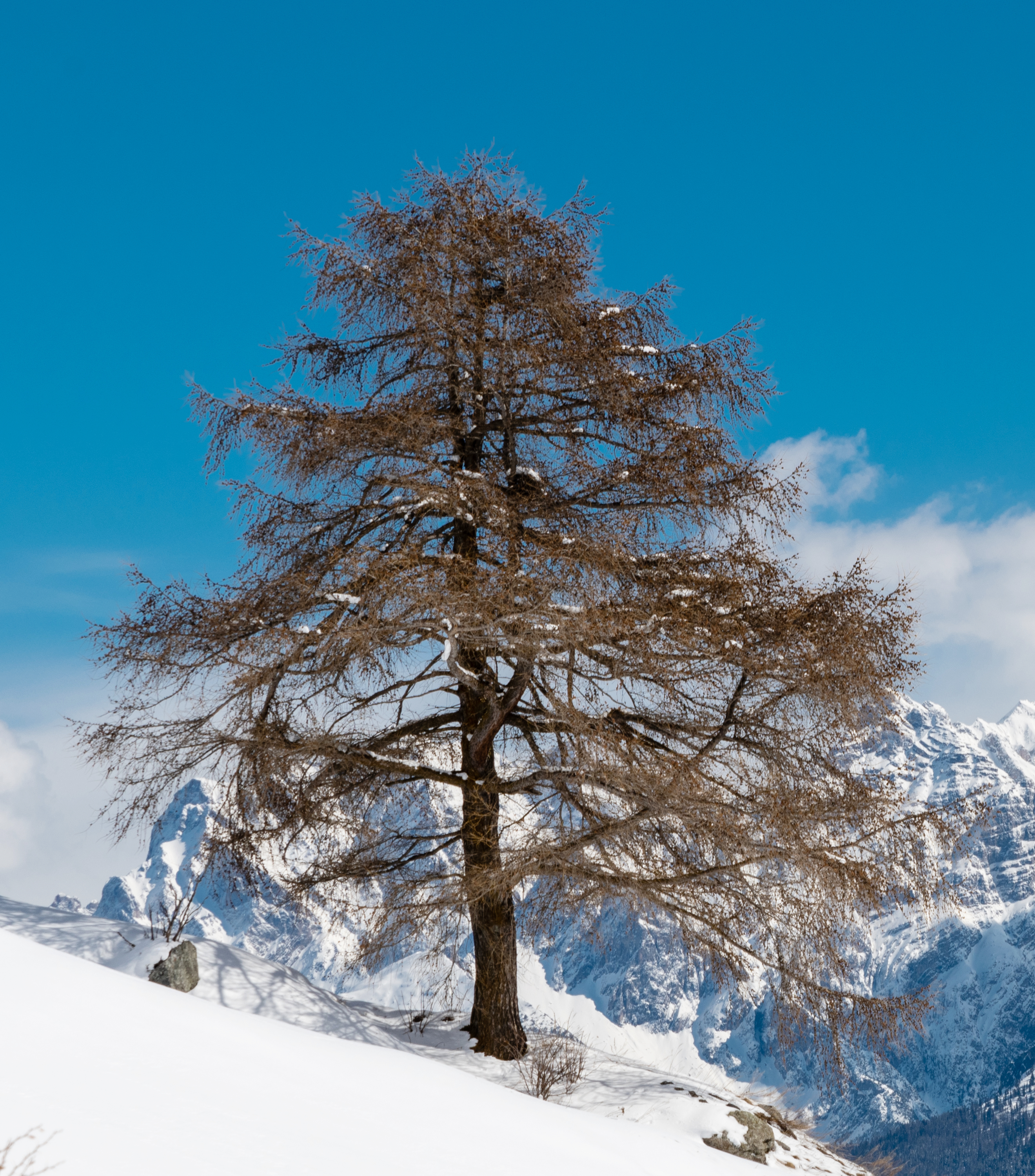
In winter, without leaves, Guarda, Graubünden, Switzerland

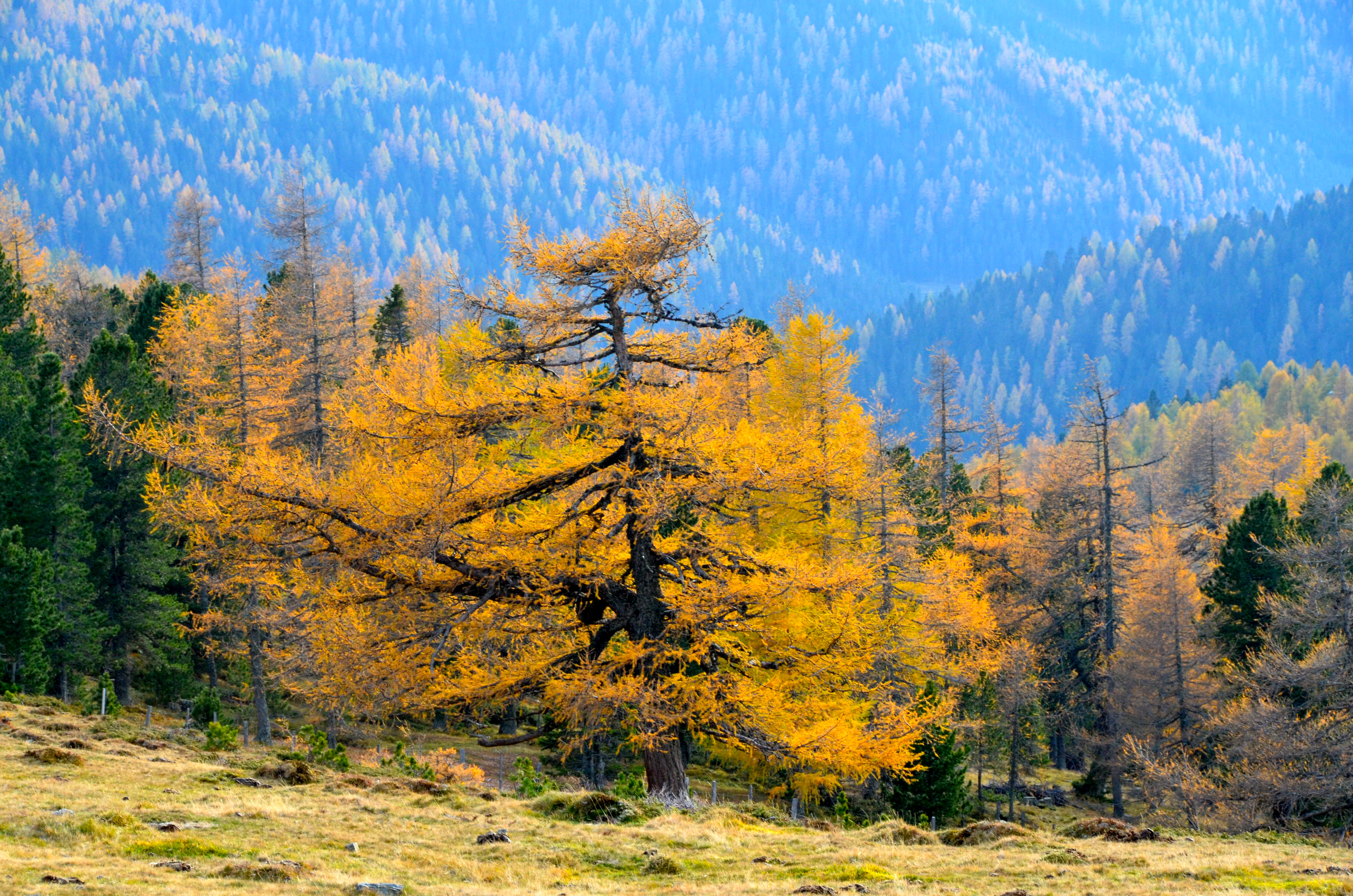
Larch in Albeck, district Feldkirchen, Carinthia, Austria

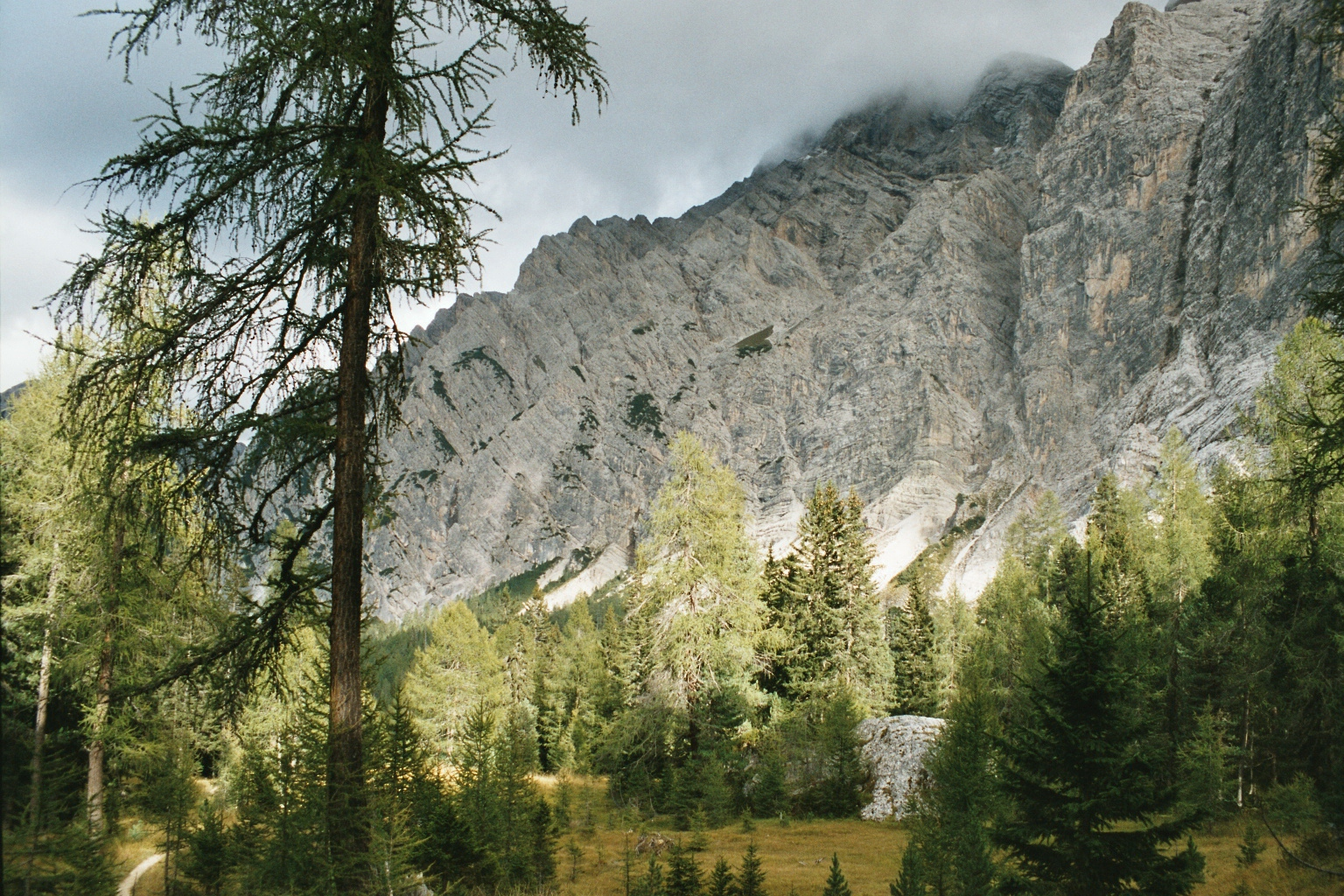
South Tyrol, Wengen-La Val-La Valle

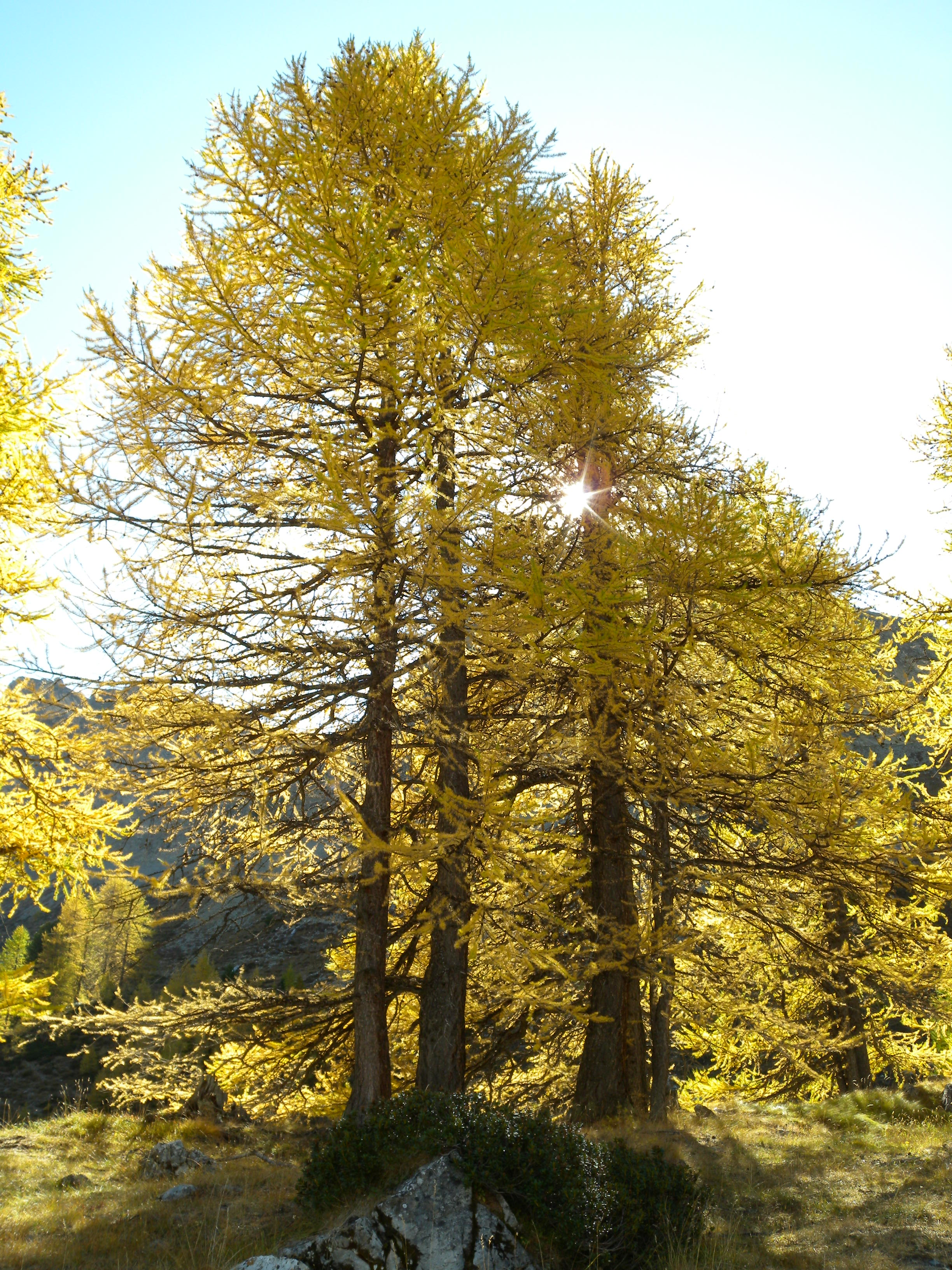
Parc régional du Queyras, Embrun, Hautes-Alpes, France

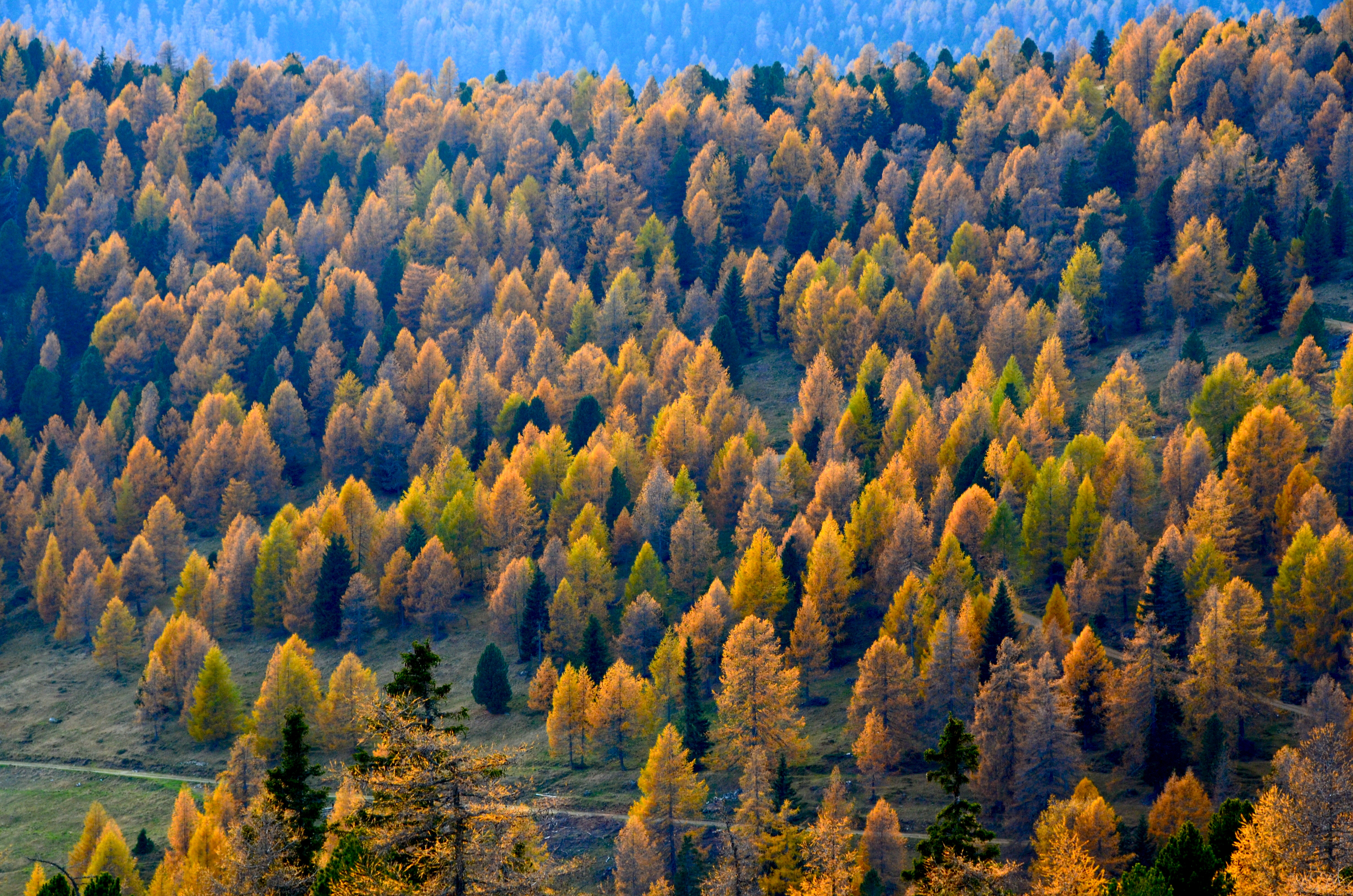
Autumnal forest with larches, spruces and arolla pines at Seebachern

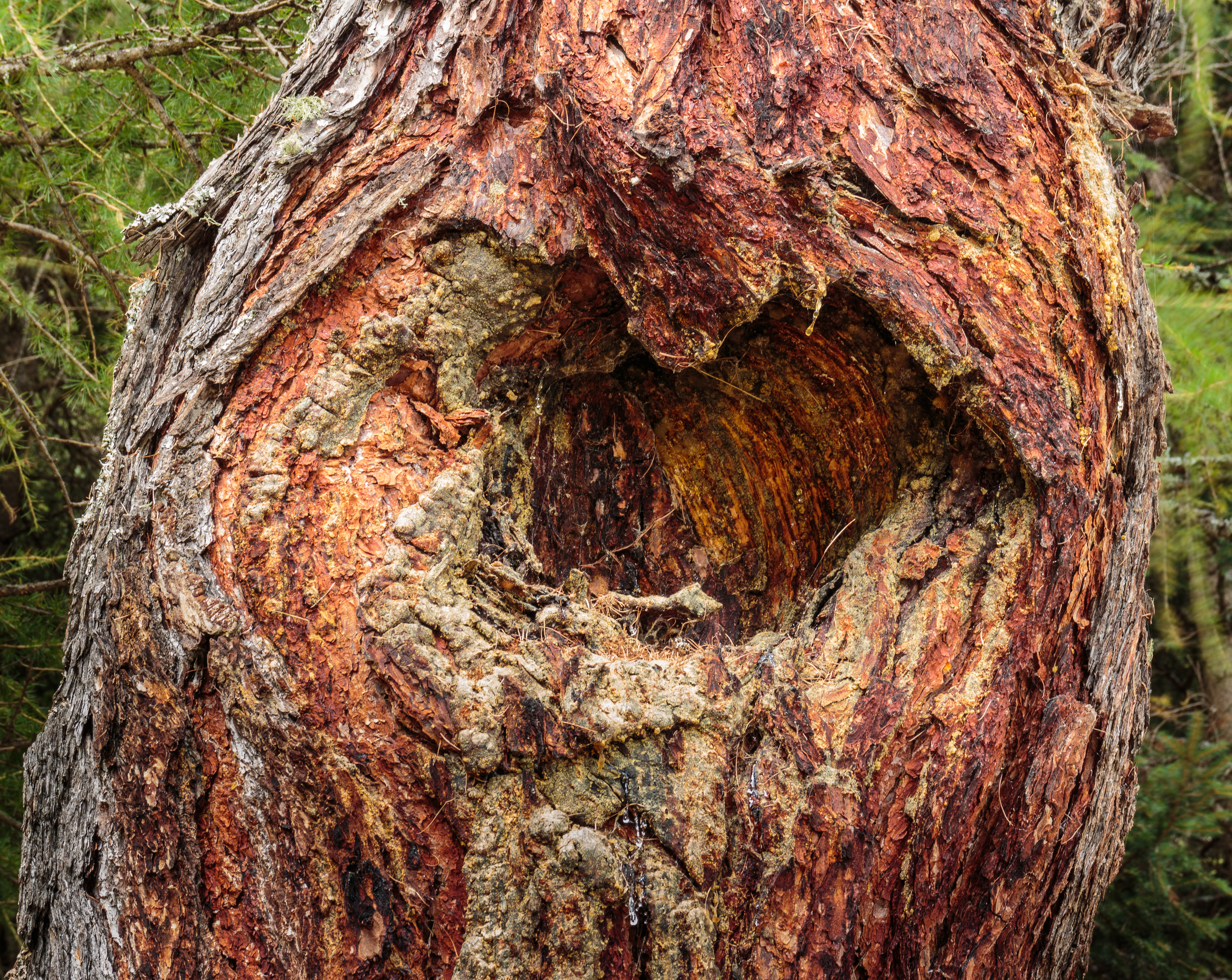
Bark, with a wound from a broken branch.

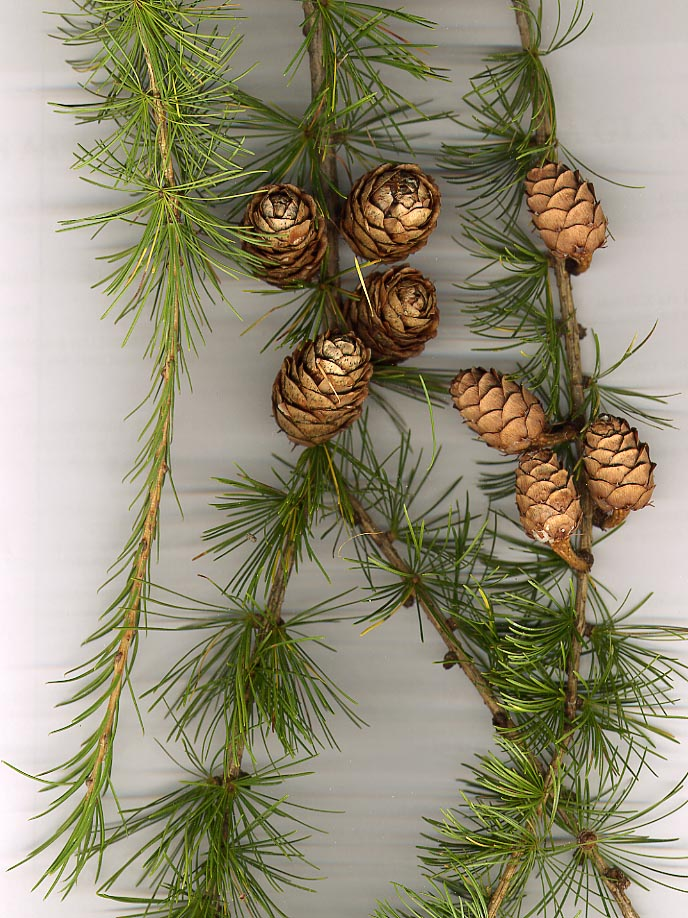
European larch foliage and cones

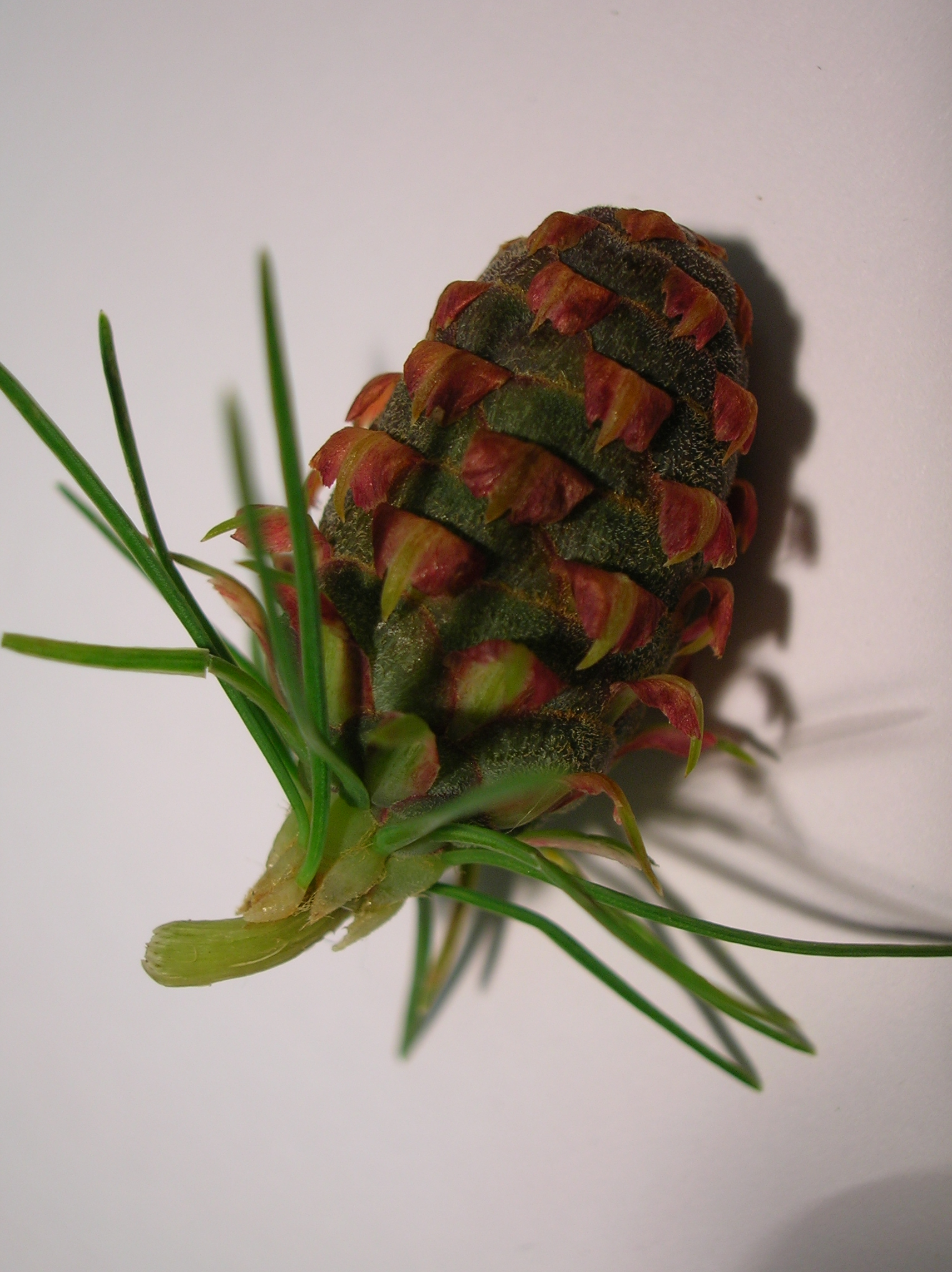
Developing seed cone in detail

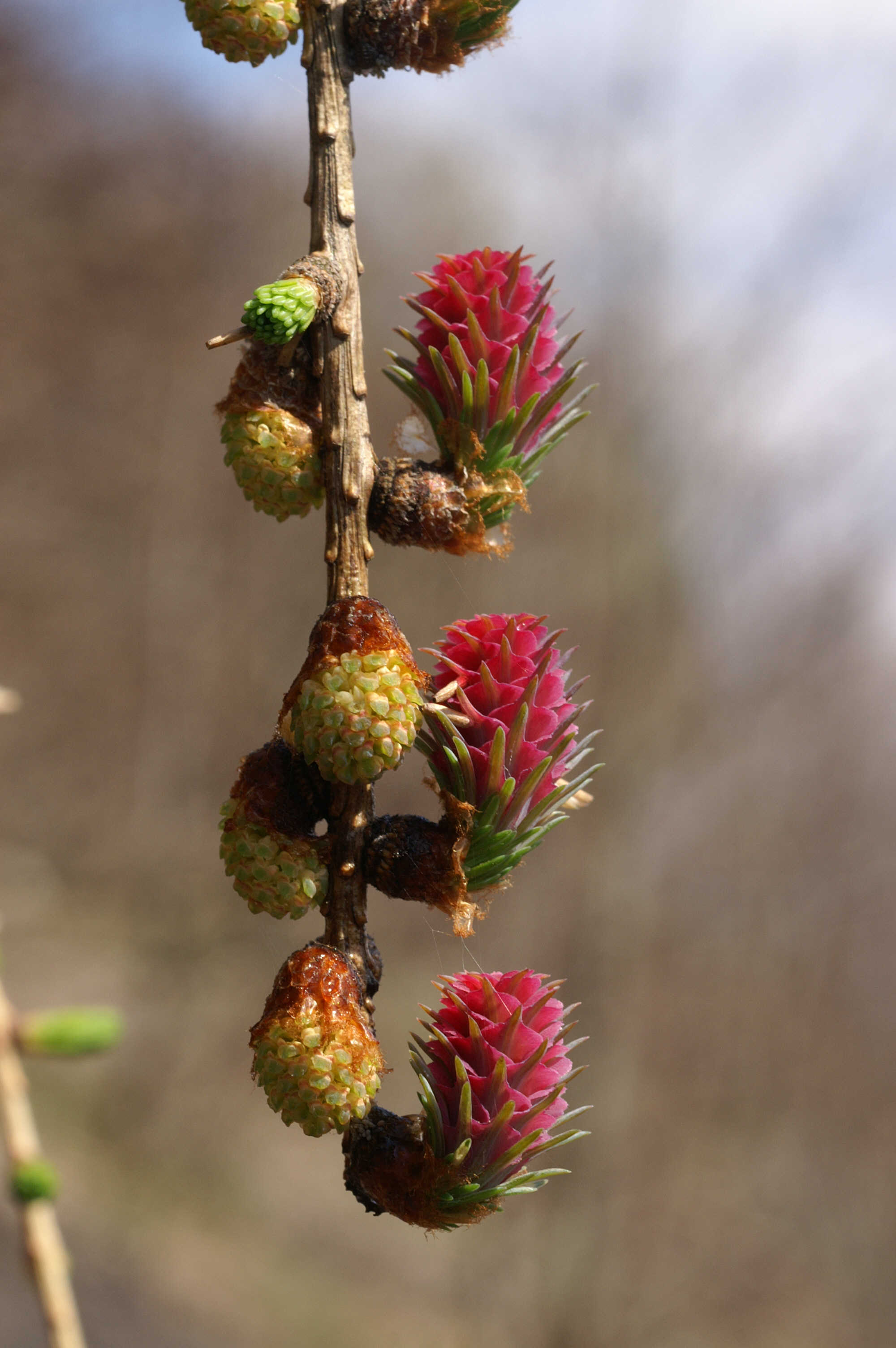
Young seed cones (red) and pollen cones (yellow)

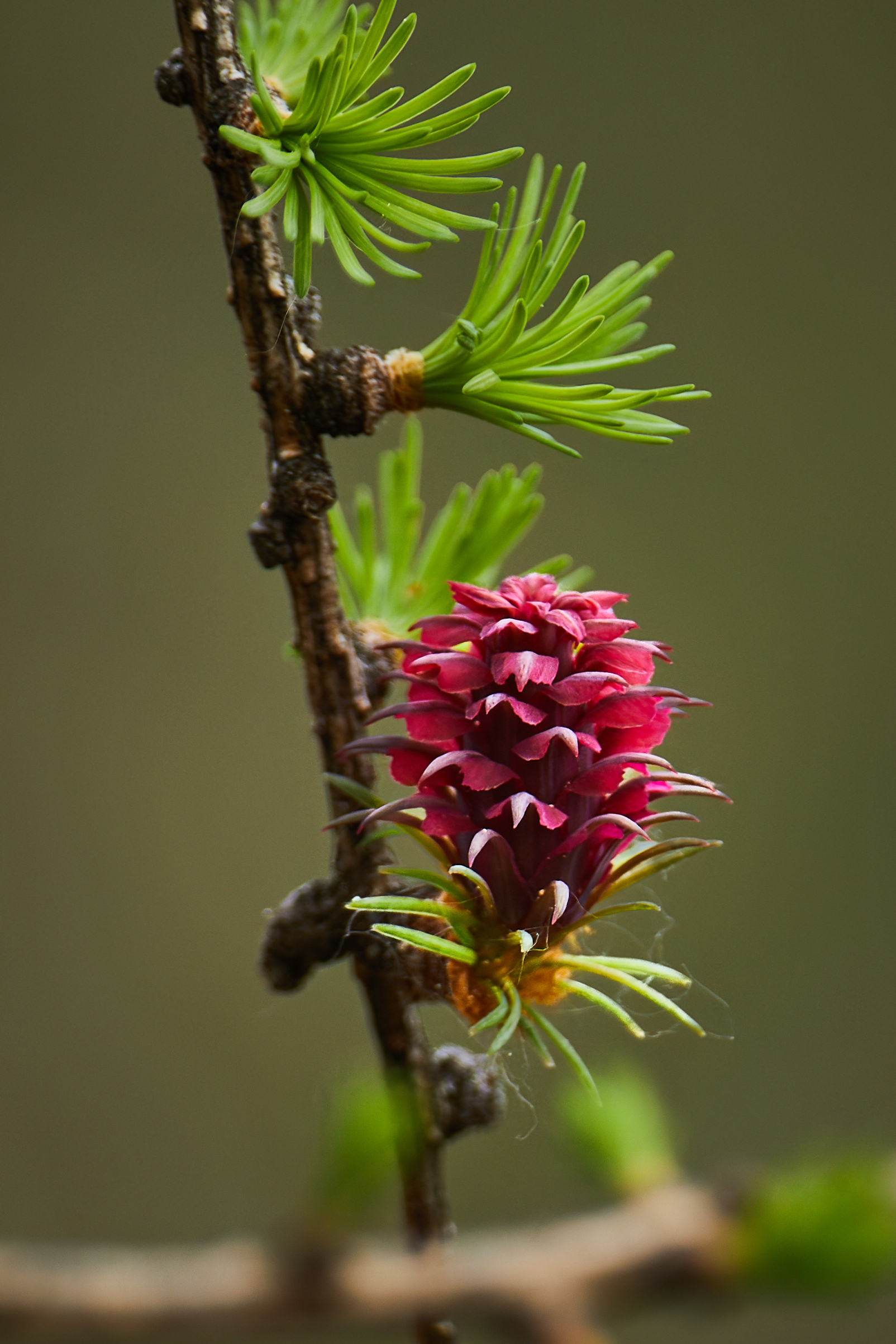
Young female cone

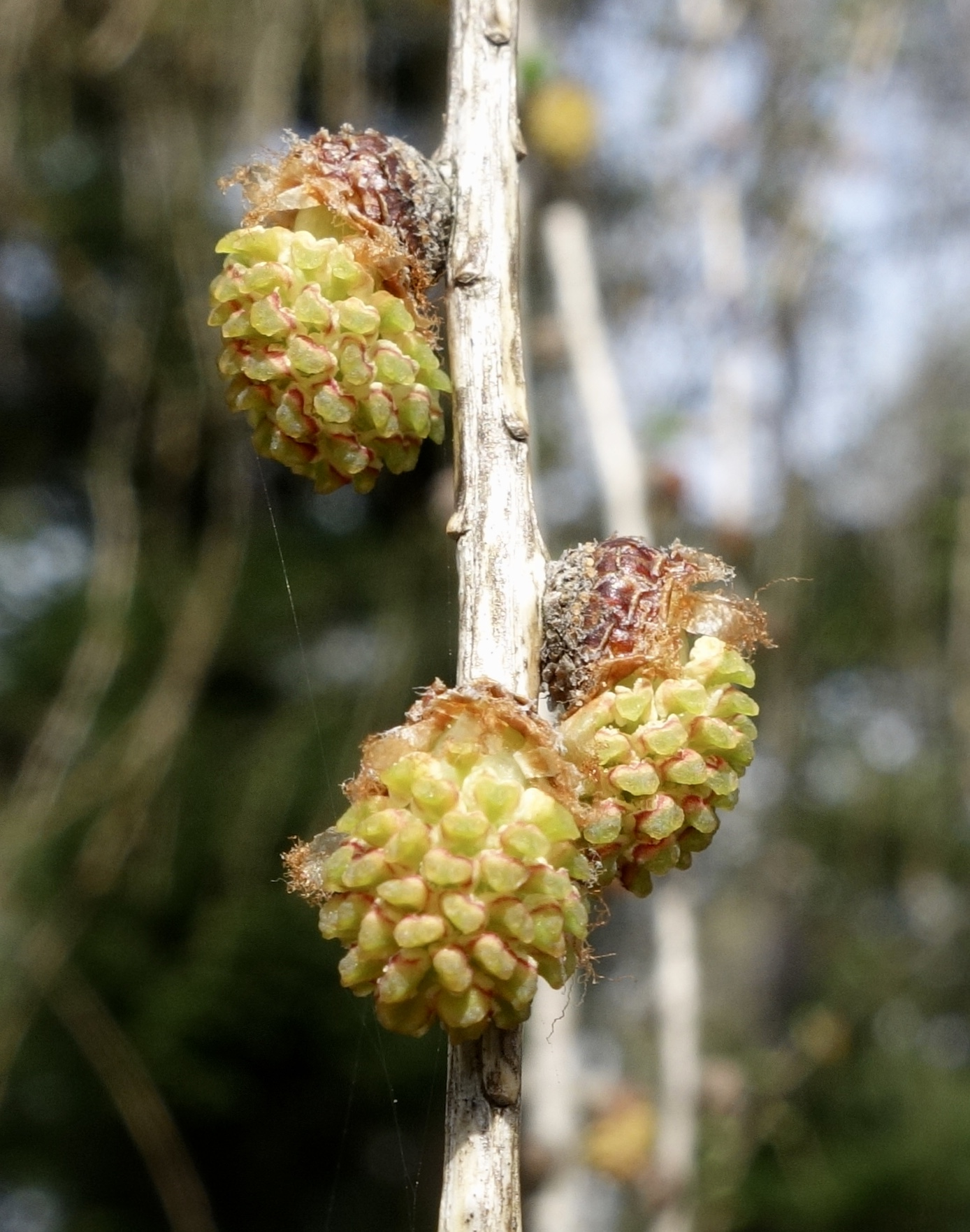
Male cones

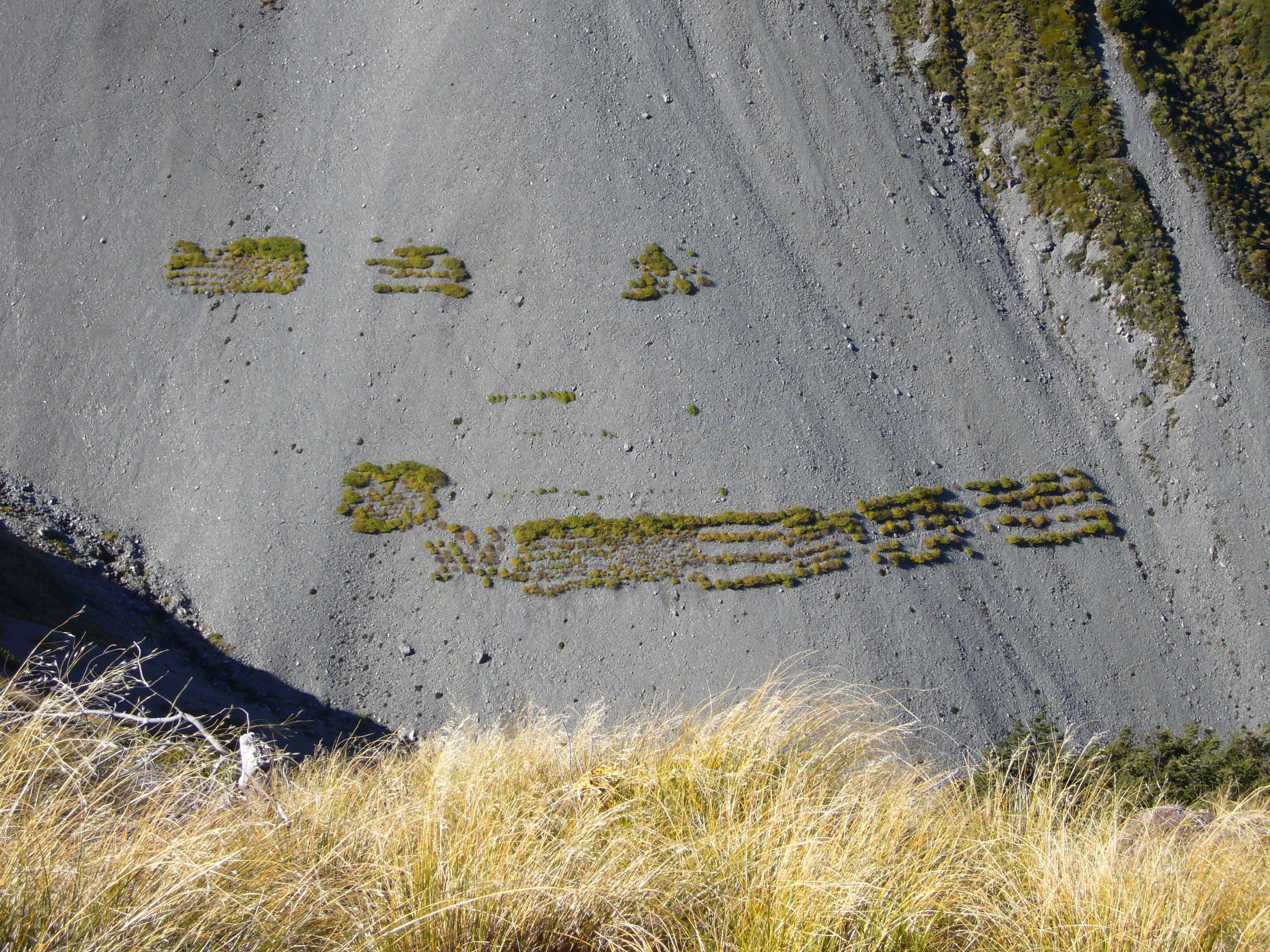
European larch planted for erosion control on a scree slope in Canterbury, New Zealand

Close-up of leaves
