= Coleophora sibiricella =

Scientific classification
- Kingdom: Animalia
- Phylum: Arthropoda
- Class: Insecta
- Order: Lepidoptera
- Family: Coleophoridae
- Genus: Coleophora
- Species: C. sibiricella

Binomial name
- Coleophora sibiricella Falkovitsh, 1972

Synonyms
- Protocryptis sibiricella; Coleophora sibirica Falkovitsh, 1964 (preocc.); Coleophora reznikiella Vives, 1984

Species of moth

Coleophora sibiricella is a moth of the family Coleophoridae first described by Mark I. Falkovitsh in 1972. It is found in Finland, Sweden, north-western Russia and Siberia.

Adults are on wing in June and July.

The larvae feed on Larix species. They have a winter diapause.
