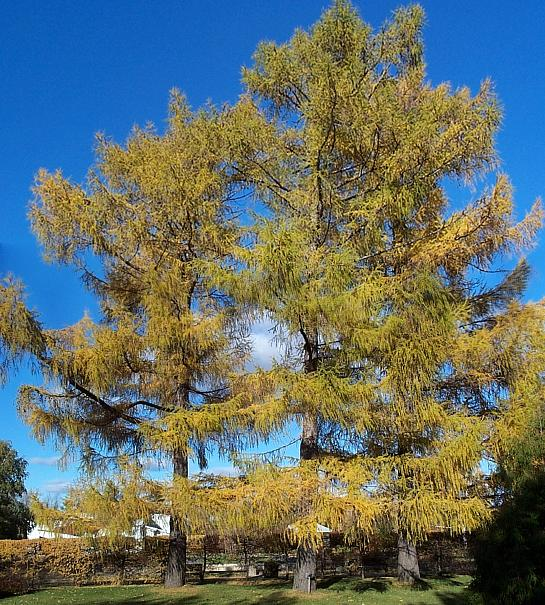
- Siberian larch in Montreal Botanic Gardens

Conservation status
- Least Concern (IUCN 3.1)

Scientific classification
- Kingdom: Plantae
- Clade: Tracheophytes
- Clade: Gymnosperms
- Division: Pinophyta
- Class: Pinopsida
- Order: Pinales
- Family: Pinaceae
- Genus: Larix
- Species: L. sibirica

Binomial name
- Larix sibirica Ledeb.

Synonyms
- List: Larix altaica Fisch. ex Gordon & Glend.; Larix archangelica C.Lawson; Larix europaea Middend.; Larix pseudolarix Lodd. ex Gordon & Glend.; Larix sibirica var. hybrida Y.N.Lee; Larix sibirica var. viridis R.E.Schroed.; Larix sibirica var. viridis Y.N.Lee; Larix sukaczewii Dylis; Pinus pseudolarix Steud.

= Larix sibirica =

Species of conifer

Larix sibirica, the Siberian larch or Russian larch, is a frost-hardy tree native to western Russia, from close to the Finnish border east to the Yenisei valley in central Siberia, where it hybridises with the Dahurian larch L. gmelinii of eastern Siberia; the hybrid is known as Larix × czekanowskii. It is also native to parts of Central and Eastern Asia.

== Description ==
It is a medium-size to large deciduous coniferous tree reaching 20–50 m tall, with a trunk up to 1 m diameter. The crown is conic when young, becoming broad with age; the main branches are level to upswept, with the side branches often pendulous. The shoots are dimorphic, with growth divided into long shoots (typically 10–50 cm long) and bearing several buds, and short shoots only 1–2 mm long with only a single bud. It has bimorphic needles, with needles on new growth borne singly and arranged in a spiral around the branch and needles on older wood borne in clusters of 15-40 needles on short spurs. It is most easily distinguished from the closely related European larch by the shoots being downy (hairless in European larch). The leaves are needle-like, light green, 2–5 cm long, and turn bright yellow before they fall in the autumn, leaving the pale yellow-buff shoots bare until the next spring.

The male and female cones are borne separately on the same tree; pollination is in early spring. The male cones are solitary, yellow, globose to oblong, 4–8 mm diameter, and produce wingless pollen. The mature female cones are erect, ovoid-conic, 2–5 cm long, with 30-70 erect or slightly incurved (not reflexed) and downy seed scales; they are green variably flushed red when immature, turning brown and opening to release the winged seeds when mature, 4–6 months after pollination. The old cones commonly remain on the tree for many years, turning dull grey-black. The minimum seed-bearing age is 10–15 years.

== Distribution ==
The Siberian larch is native to Russia, Mongolia, Kazakhstan, and Western China, where it grows in temperate and tundra biomes. The species is particularly dominant in the Ural Mountains and throughout Mongolia, where it accounts for approximately 80% of the total forested area.

== Uses ==
Because of its rot resistance, larch wood is especially valuable for posts, poles, railroad tie sleepers, and mine props.

It is also used in many velodromes around the world as the track surface including the Manchester Velodrome and the Velodrome Krylatskoye in Moscow.

It is grown in Canada and the northern United States to a limited extent, first cultivated there in 1806. It was also introduced to Iceland and Greenland.

It is faster-growing than many other coniferous trees in cold regions, but requires full sunlight. When grown in plantations it should be kept widely spaced, and intensive thinning is required.

Resin of siberian larch (as well as of siberian cedar) is used as a natural chewing gum, which is commercially produced by several manufacturers in Russia.

See also List of Lepidoptera that feed on larches

Larix sibirica cone scales are used as food by the caterpillars of the tortrix moth Cydia illutana.

== Gallery ==
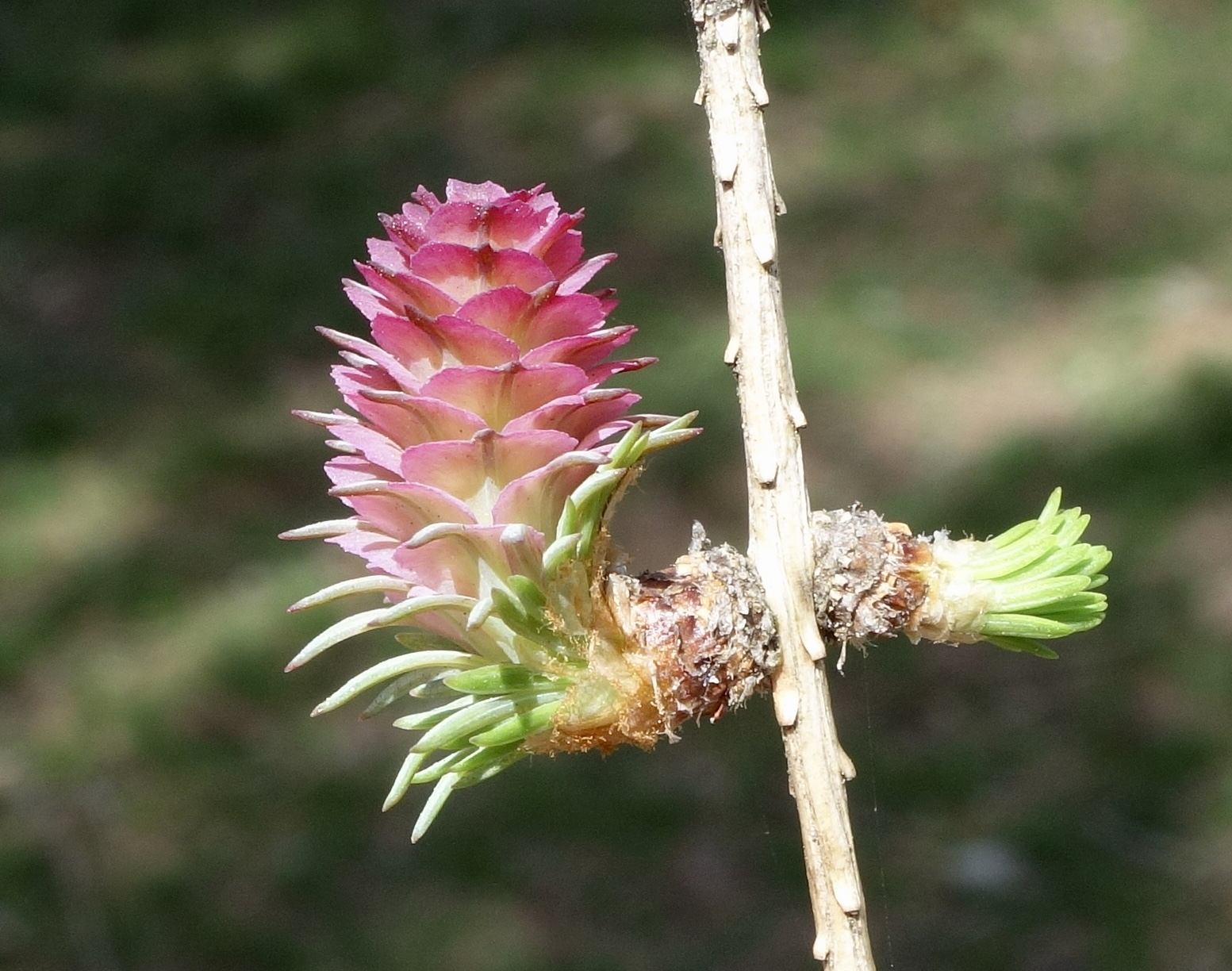
Young female cone

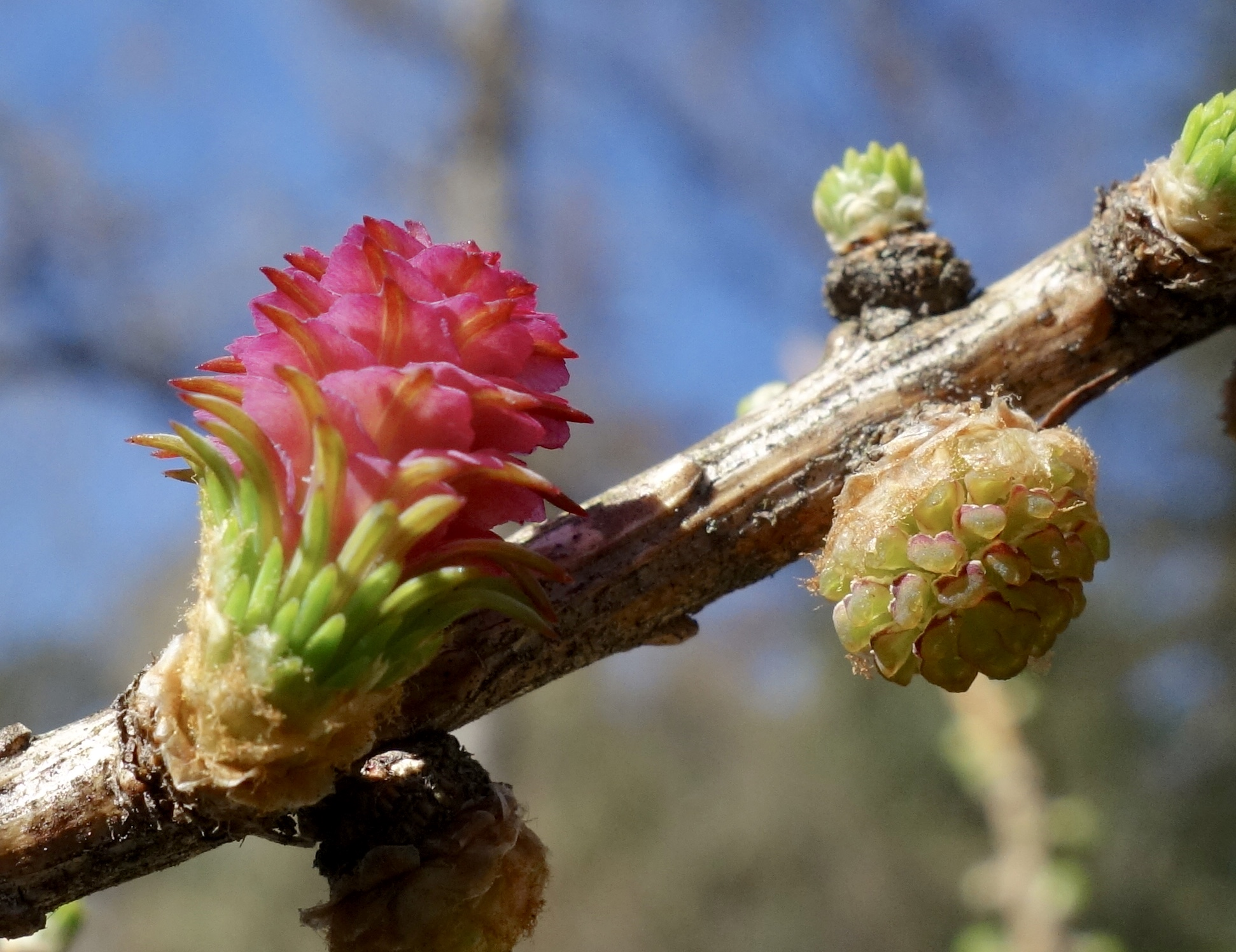
Female cone (left), male cone (right)

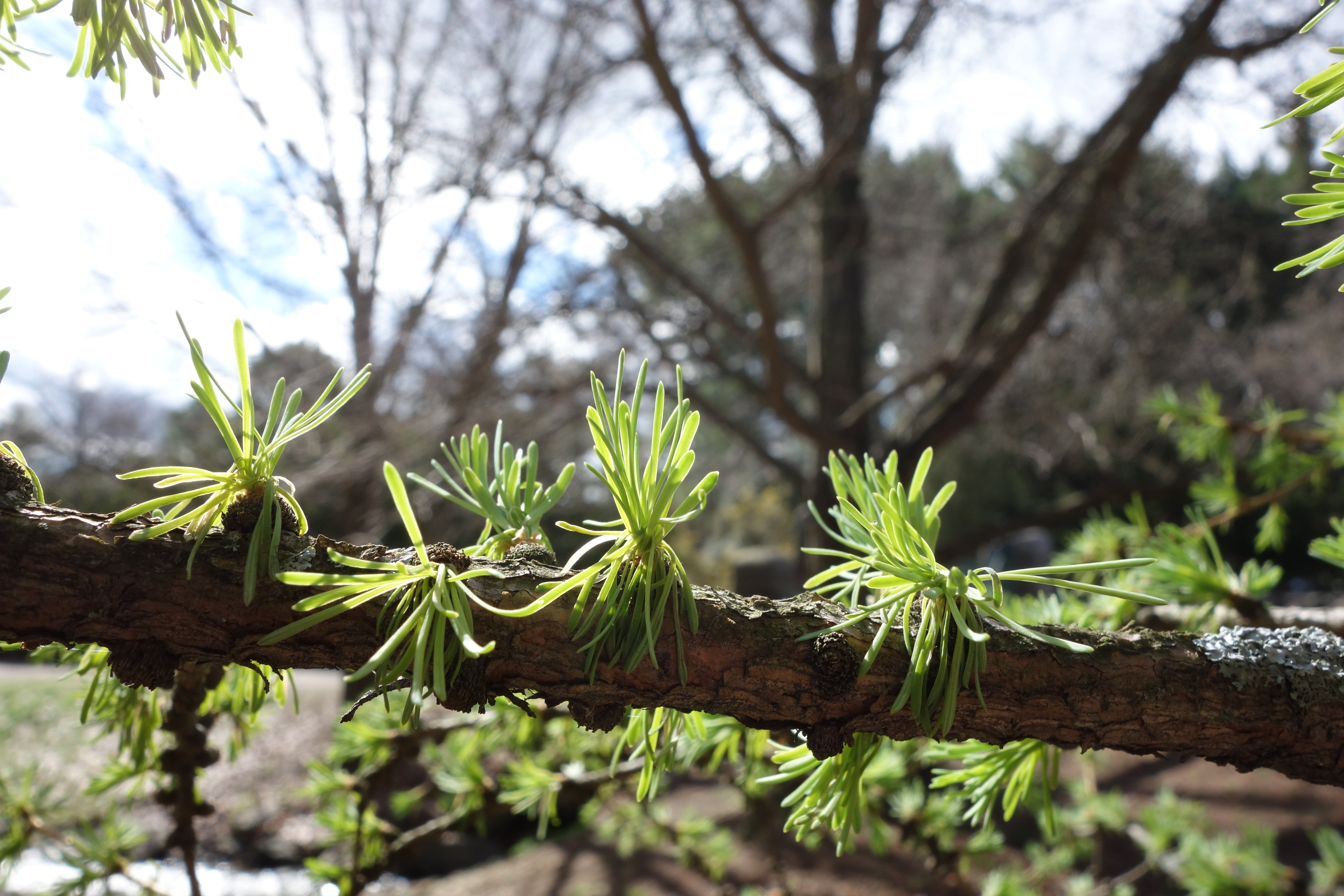
Short shoots after bud break

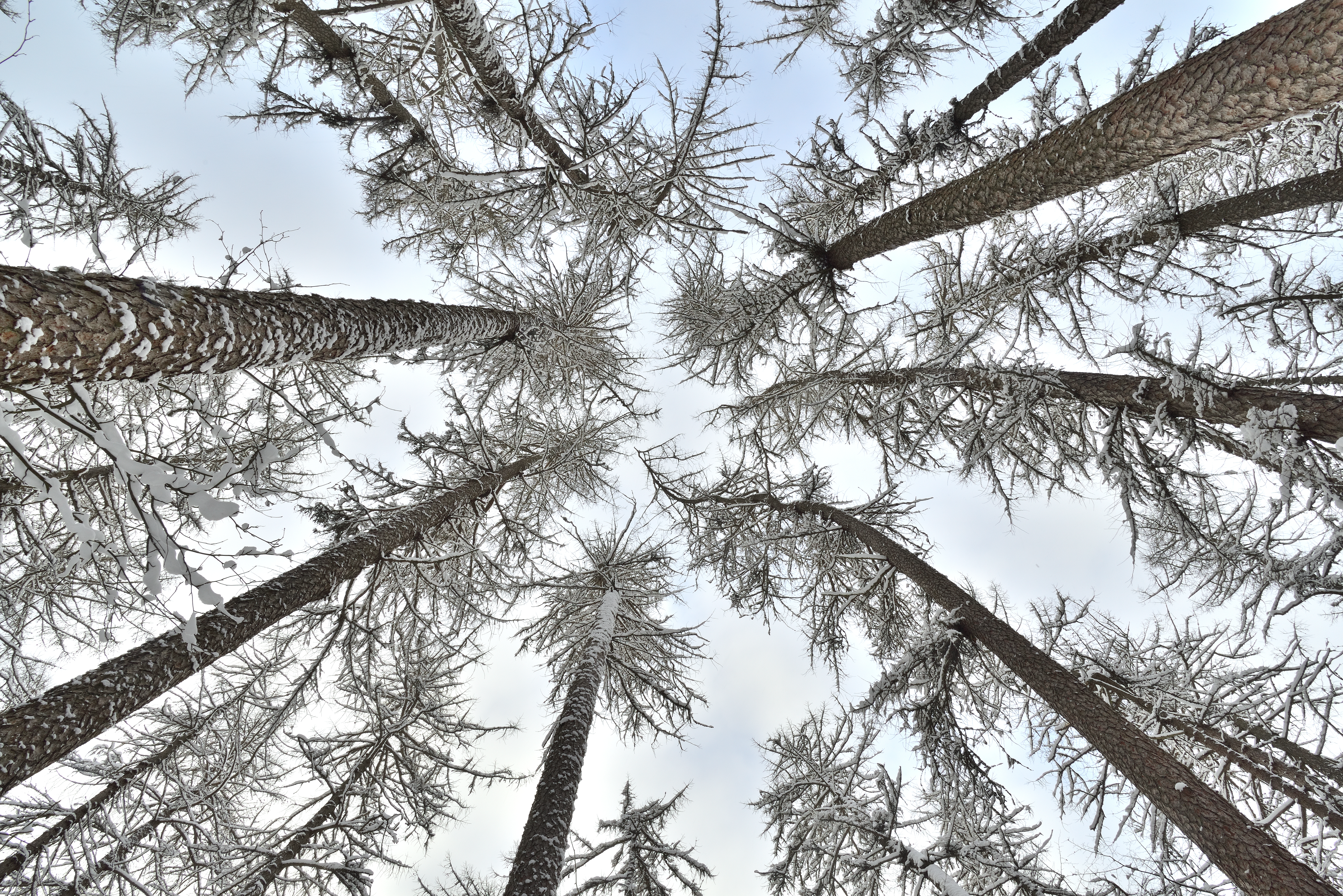
Crowns of Siberian larch in winter
