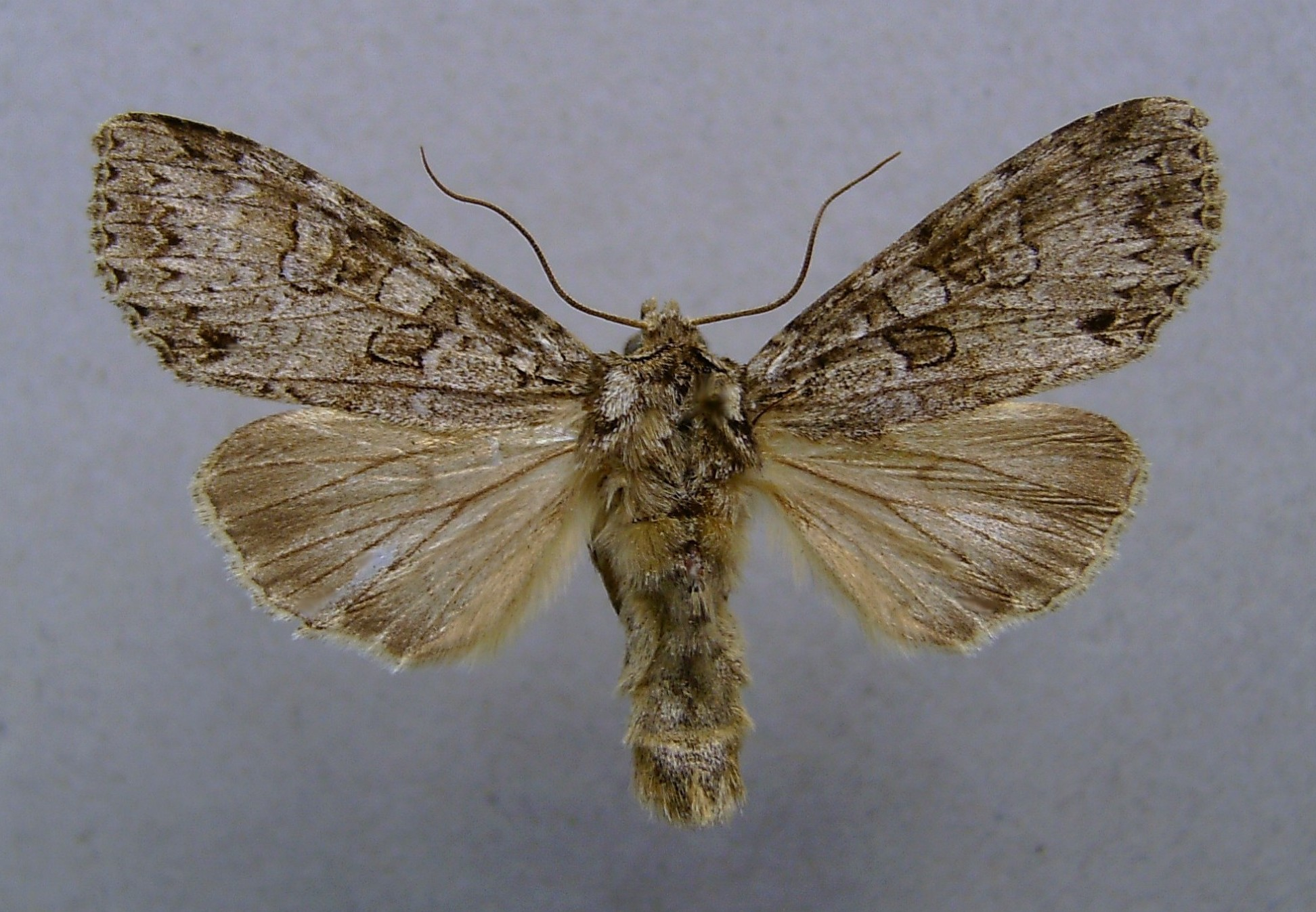

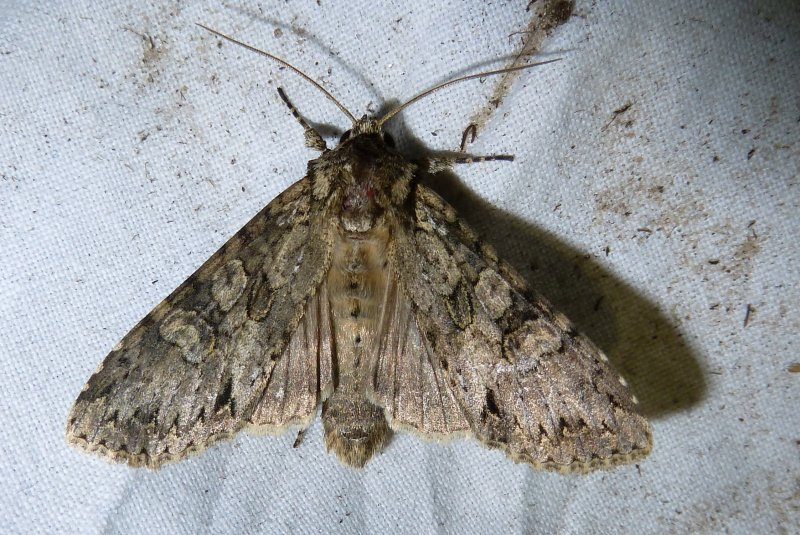

Scientific classification
- Kingdom: Animalia
- Phylum: Arthropoda
- Clade: Pancrustacea
- Class: Insecta
- Order: Lepidoptera
- Superfamily: Noctuoidea
- Family: Noctuidae
- Genus: Polia
- Species: P. nebulosa

Binomial name
- Polia nebulosa (Hufnagel, 1766)

Synonyms
- Phalaena nebulosa Hufnagel, 1766; Phalaena (Noctua) bimaculosa Esper, 1788; Phalaena (Noctua) bimaculosa Esper, 1796; Phalaena (Noctua) thapsi Brahm, 1791; Phalaena grandis Donovan, 1801; Noctua plebeja Hübner, [1803]

= Polia nebulosa =

Species of moth

Polia nebulosa, the grey arches, is a moth of the family Noctuidae. The species was first described by Johann Siegfried Hufnagel in 1766. It is found in temperate Europe and Asia up to eastern Asia and Japan. It is not present in northernmost Fennoscandia and the southern parts of the Iberian Peninsula, Italy and Greece. In the Alps it is found at heights up to 1,600 meters.

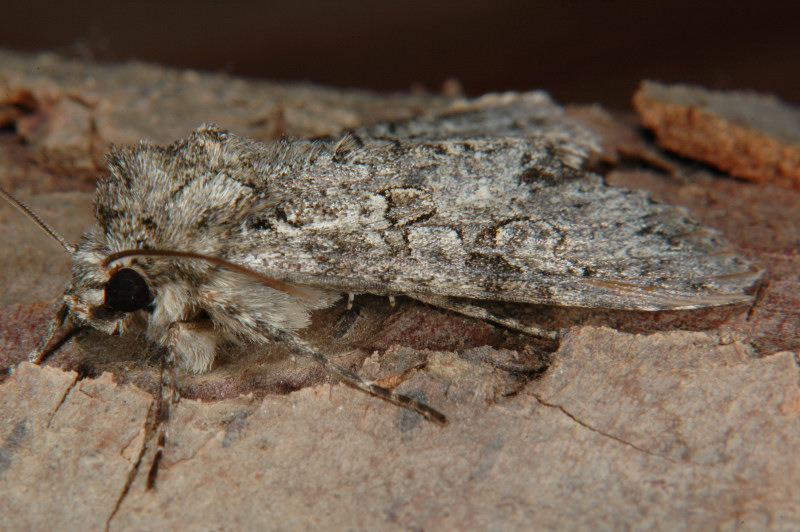

== Technical description and variation ==
The wingspan is 41–52 mm. Forewing white tinged with brownish grey; stigmata as in Polia advena and Polia tincta; submarginal line preceded by black wedge-shaped marks, with one more conspicuous before the indentation of submedian fold; hindwing dull whitish, with, cellspot, veins, and a broad marginal border smoky fuscous; — ab. pallida Tutt represents a very white form taken in Scotland, with many of the dark transverse markings obsolete; — bimaculosa Esp. is the darker grey form with blacker markings; — robsoni Collins is a strong melanic form from Cheshire in the west of England only; there are also two aberrations from East Asia, — asiatica Stgr. (= lama Stgr.) being dull grey and smaller than typical, while askolda Oberth. from Askold Island [now ssp.] is a large brown form; — ab. calabrica nov. [Warren] is a very large form; the forewing with pale blue-grey ground colour, irrorated and suffused with dark grey in basal half (in one example all over the forewing), with all the lines and stigmata strongly expressed in black and pale grey, the submarginal line in particular being continuous, black and dentate, the hindwing is likewise much darker, with all the veins, the cellspot, and outer line wellmarked; a series of four males and ten females, in the Tring Museum, taken on the Sila Mts., near Botte Donata, Calabria, 800–1000 m, July 1907, by Dr. O. Neumann. This form reminds one somewhat of Polia goliath Oberth.

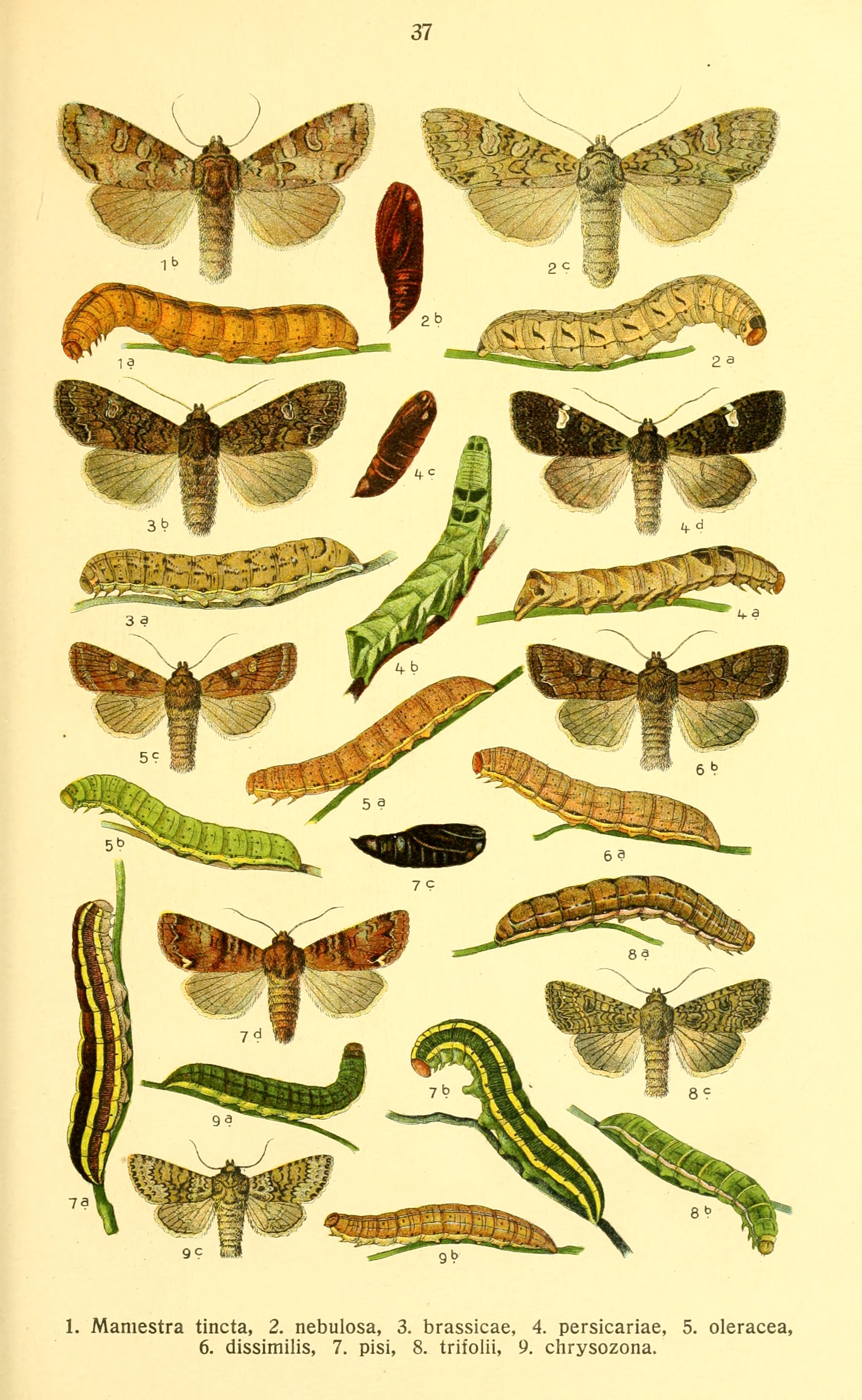
Moth, larva and pupa in Karl Eckstein Die Schmetterlinge Deutschlands (figure 2)

== Biology ==
Adults are on wing from the May to August in one generation.

Larva brownish grey or luteous (muddy yellow), with blackish freckles; large dark dorsal spots divided by the pale dorsal line, with short black oblique stripes. The larvae feed on the leaves of various plants, including Salix, Rubus and Prunus species as well as Urtica dioica.
