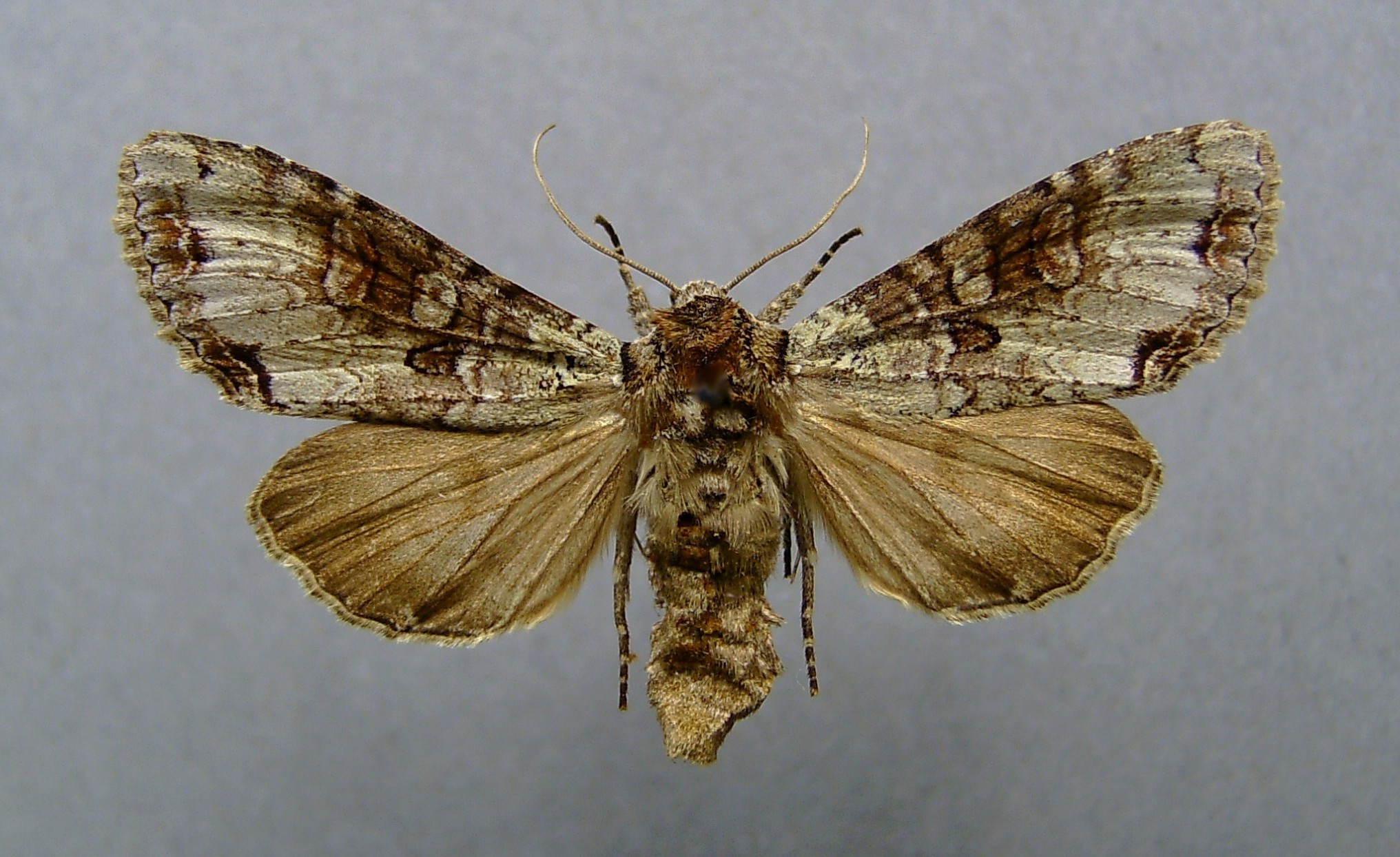

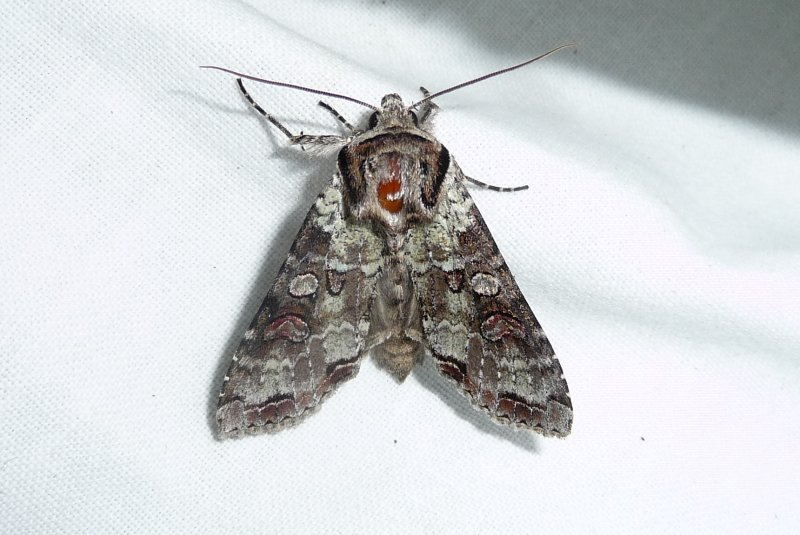

Scientific classification
- Kingdom: Animalia
- Phylum: Arthropoda
- Class: Insecta
- Order: Lepidoptera
- Superfamily: Noctuoidea
- Family: Noctuidae
- Genus: Polia
- Species: P. hepatica

Binomial name
- Polia hepatica (Clerck, 1759)

Synonyms
- Phalaena hepatica Clerck, 1759; Phalaena (Noctua) trimaculosa Esper, 1788; Phalaena (Noctua) trimaculosa Esper, 1796; Phalaena (Noctua) tincta Brahm, 1791; Noctua argentina Haworth, 1809; Mamestra tincta var. obscurata Staudinger, 1897; Polia trimaculosa; Aplecta tincta; Mamestra tincta

= Polia hepatica =

Species of moth

Polia hepatica, the silvery arches, is a moth of the family Noctuidae. The species was first described by Carl Alexander Clerck in 1759. It is found in temperate Europe and east across the Palearctic to Siberia and Korea. It is not present in northernmost Fennoscandia and the southern parts of the Iberian Peninsula, Italy and Greece. It is also absent from Japan.

The wingspan is 39–47 mm. Forewing paler than in advena, more bluish grey, sometimes blue green, without dark suffusion except in median area; stigmata as in advena, the orbicular pale and conspicuous; submarginal line preceded by black brown scales on both folds not forming wedge-shaped marks, and not indented on the submedian fold; hindwing fuscous with dark discal lunule and pale postmedian line. — the form obscurata Stgr. from Amurland is smaller and darker; hepatica Hbn. represents the form with blue green coloration and brown suffusion; in suffusa Tutt the median area is more concisely brown than the rest of the wing. — Larva reddish brown, with fine dark and light mottling; dorsal line slender, white, edged with black; lateral line broader; head pale brown.

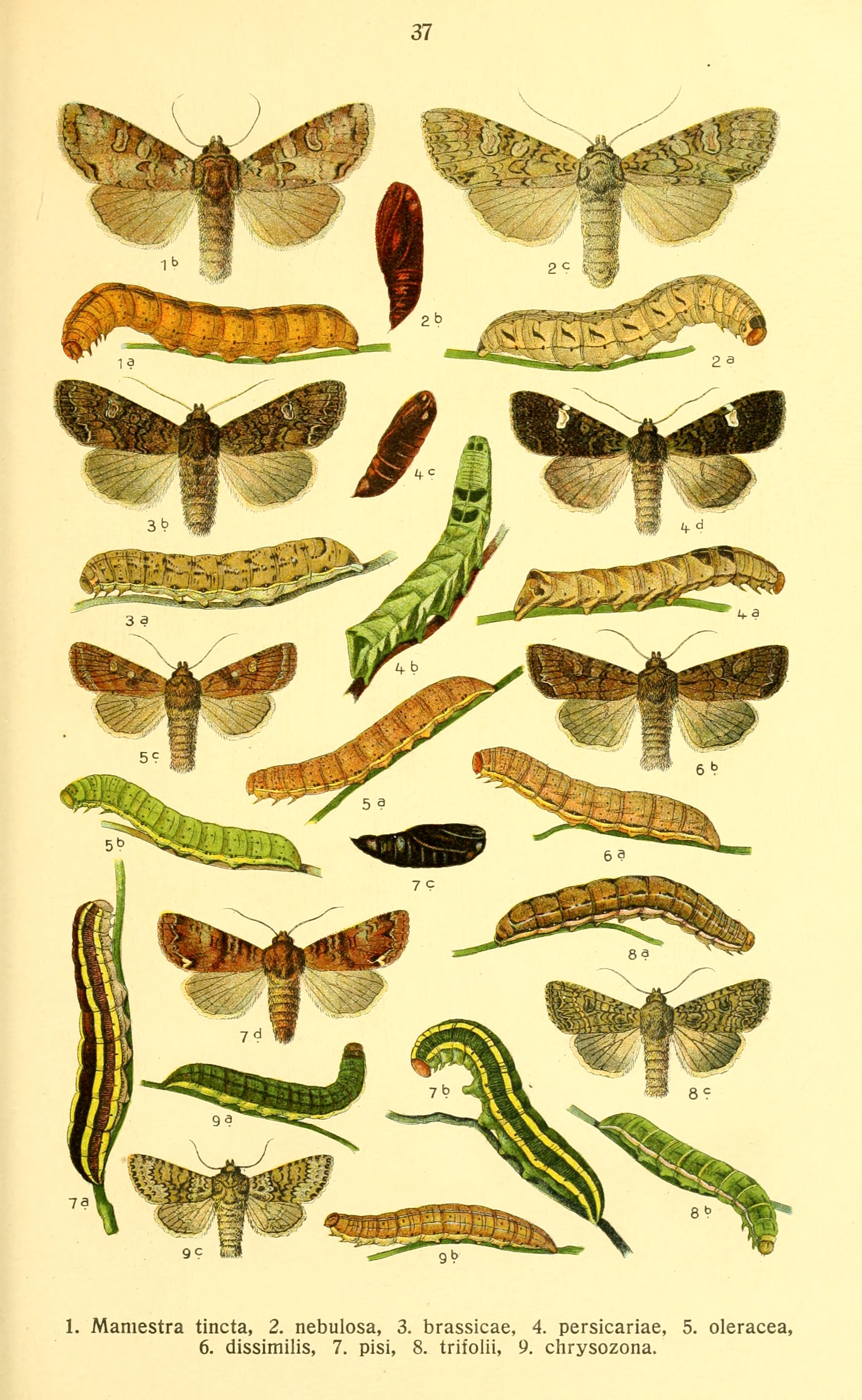
Moth and larva in Karl Eckstein Die Schmetterlinge Deutschlands (figure 1)

== Biology ==
Adults are on wing from the end of May to the beginning of August in one generation.

The larvae feed on the leaves of Vaccinium, Rubus and Betula species.
