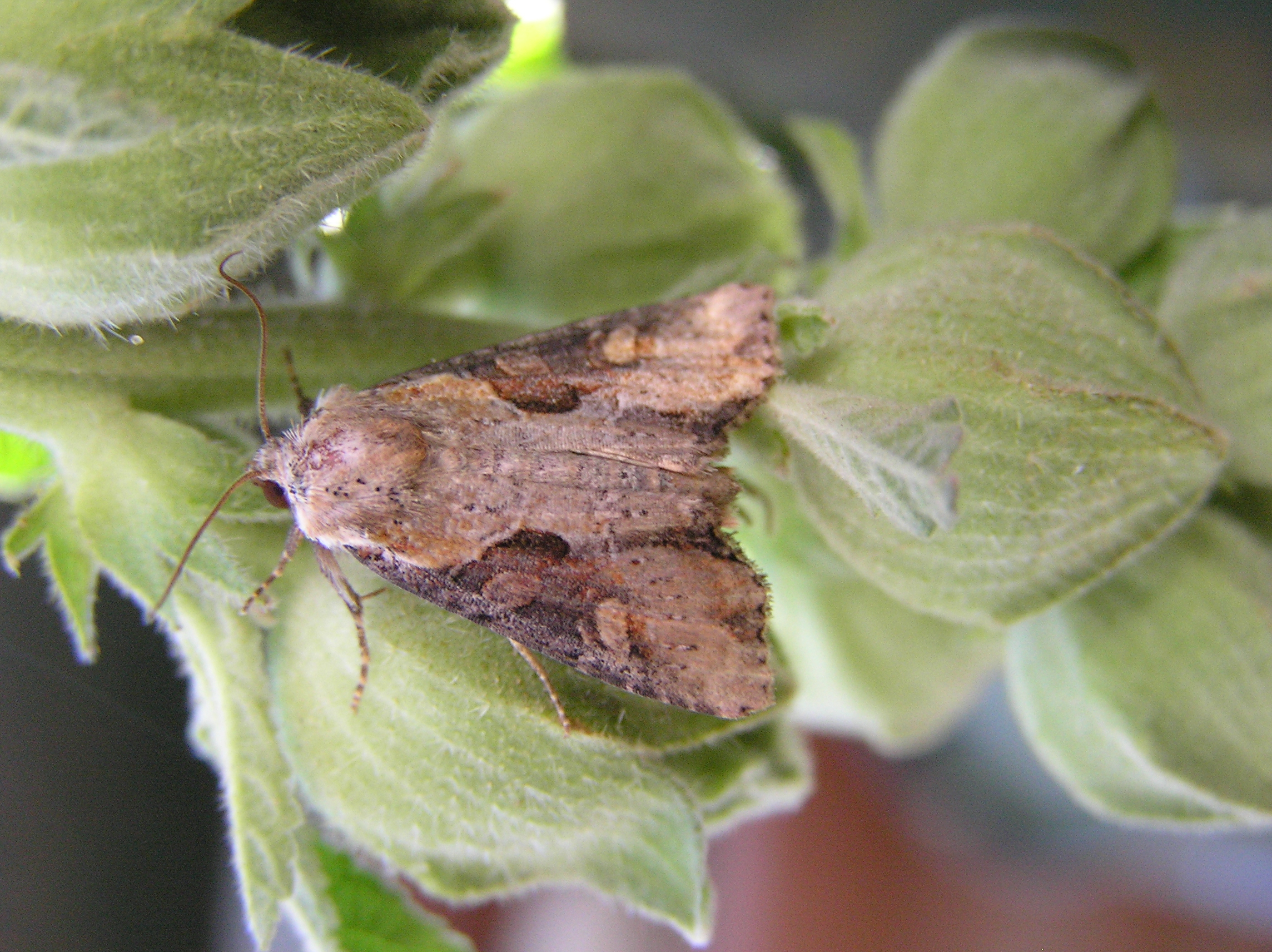

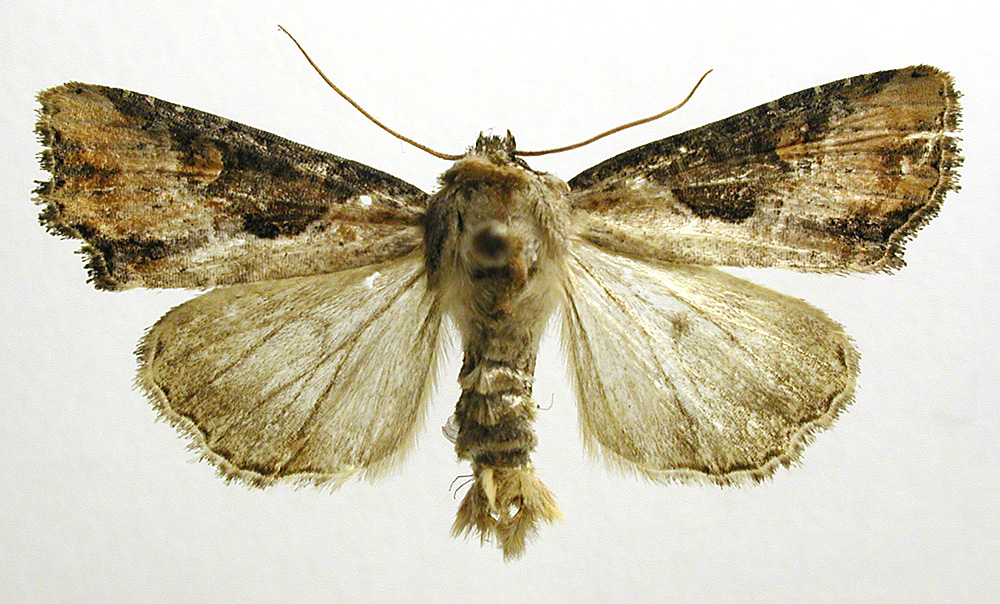

Scientific classification
- Domain: Eukaryota
- Kingdom: Animalia
- Phylum: Arthropoda
- Class: Insecta
- Order: Lepidoptera
- Superfamily: Noctuoidea
- Family: Noctuidae
- Genus: Apamea
- Species: A. ophiogramma

Binomial name
- Apamea ophiogramma (Esper, 1793)

Synonyms
- Lateroligia ophiogramma (Esper, 1793)

= Apamea ophiogramma =

Double lobed

Species of moth

Apamea ophiogramma, the double lobed, is a moth of the family Noctuidae. It is found in the Palearctic realm in North and Central Europe to the Urals, Turkestan, Russian Far East, and Siberia. There have been at least two separate introductions into North America and it is now rapidly expanding in range. This species is sometimes placed in the monotypic genus Lateroligia.

== Technical description and variation ==
This moth has a wingspan of 32 to 35 mm. The forewings are 13 to 16 mm long. Forewing pale ochreous suffused with olive grey along inner margin and in terminal area with pale brownish; the inner and outer lines brown, conversely lunulate-dentate; the upper half of median area occupied by a red-brown or black brown blotch bilobed below, the lower lobe being formed by the dark brown claviform stigma; the upper stigmata somewhat paler and with pale annuli; the patch extends narrowly along costa to base and has its lower edge often lined with white scales; submarginal line pale, generally enlarged into an apical spot, preceded by a rufous brown shade and followed by two grey brown patches on the two folds, that on submedian being generally produced inwards to outer line; hindwing pale grey with dark cellspot and veins.

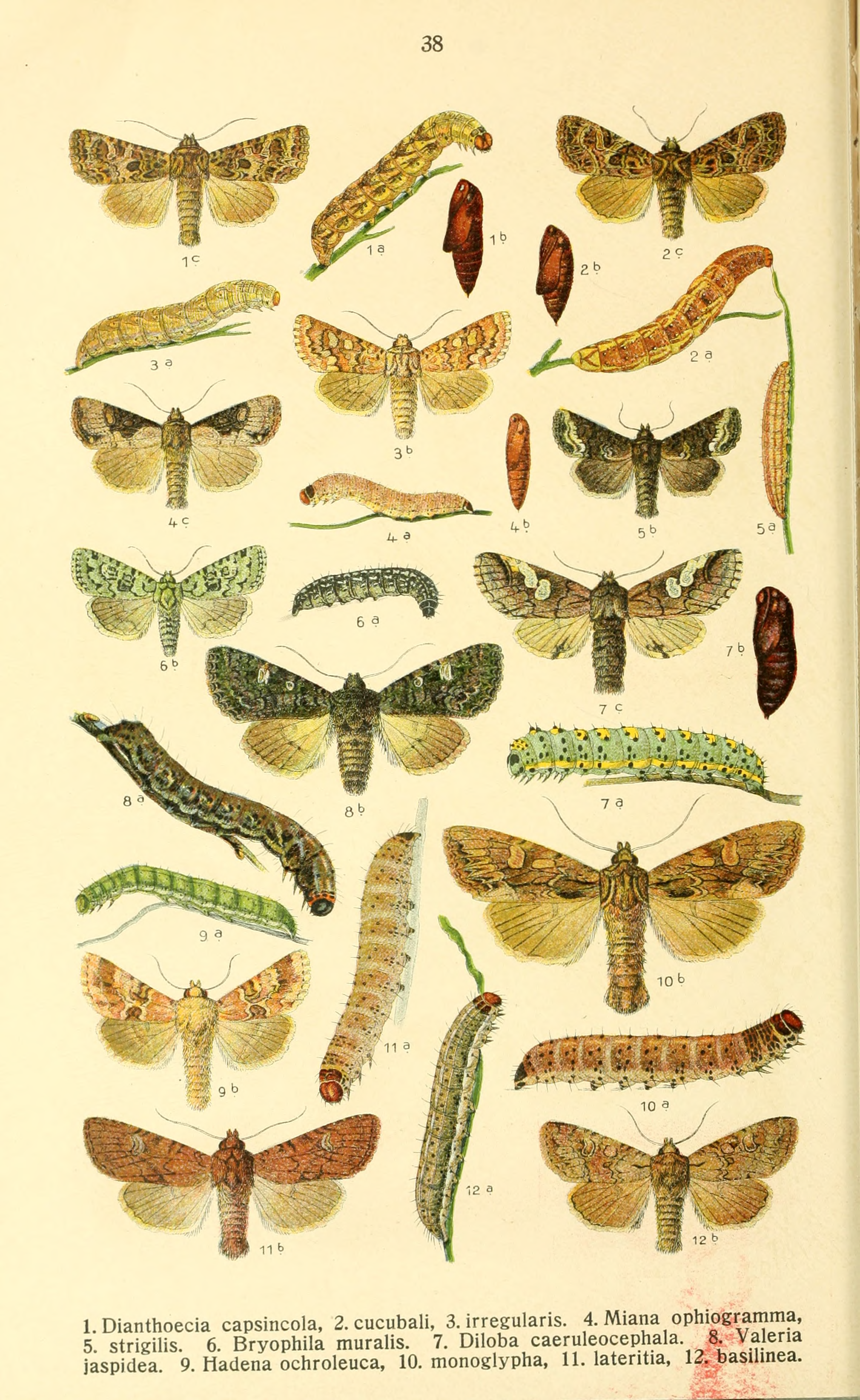
Moth and larva in Karl Eckstein Die Schmetterlinge DeutschlandsLarva, pupa and moth (figures 4)

== Biology ==
This moth flies at night and is attracted to light and sugar. Its flight season in the British Isles is June through August.

Larva pinkish ochreous with a pale lateral line; the tubercles black; head yellow brown; thoracic and anal plates black brown. The larva feeds and overwinters on reed canary-grass (Phalaris arundinacea), Glyceria spectabilis and reed sweet-grass (Glyceria maxima).

The main habitat is the banks of rivers and lakes, coastal areas as well as moors, floodplains and wet meadows. In the Alps it rises to about 2000 meters above sea level.
