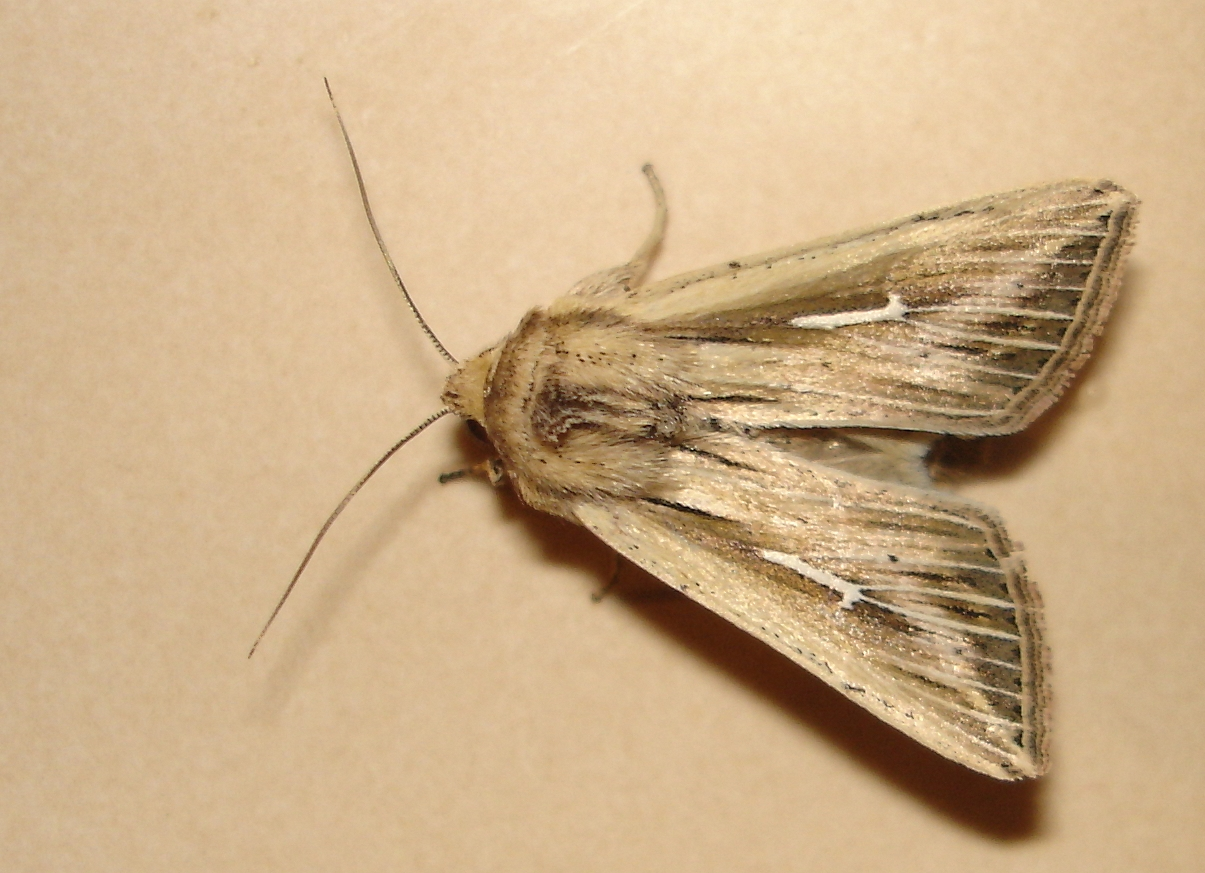

Scientific classification
- Kingdom: Animalia
- Phylum: Arthropoda
- Class: Insecta
- Order: Lepidoptera
- Superfamily: Noctuoidea
- Family: Noctuidae
- Genus: Mythimna
- Species: M. l-album

Binomial name
- Mythimna l-album (Linnaeus, 1767)

= Mythimna l-album =

Species of moth

Mythimna l-album, the L-album wainscot, is a moth of the family Noctuidae. The species was first described by Carl Linnaeus in his 1767 12th edition of Systema Naturae. It is distributed throughout Europe, but is also found in North Africa from Morocco to Tunisia and in the Levant, then east across the Palearctic to Central Asia. It is not found in the far north of the Arabian Peninsula. The limit in the north varies. It occurs on the northern edge of the range as a migrant. From southern England, then Denmark and southern Scandinavia, the north limit cuts across the Baltic Sea across the Baltic states then south of Moscow to the Urals.

== Technical description and variation ==
The wingspan is 30–35 mm. The length of the forewings varies from 15 to 16 mm. Forewing greyish ochreous, tinged with olive brown through cell towards apex and along outer margin below apex; outer half of median vein white, shortly hooked at end; veins 3 and 4 whitish: a black streak from base below cell; veins pale outlined with dark; the oblique streak from apex with black marks between veins on each side; a pale submarginal band below middle; hindwing grey, becoming fuscous towards termen.

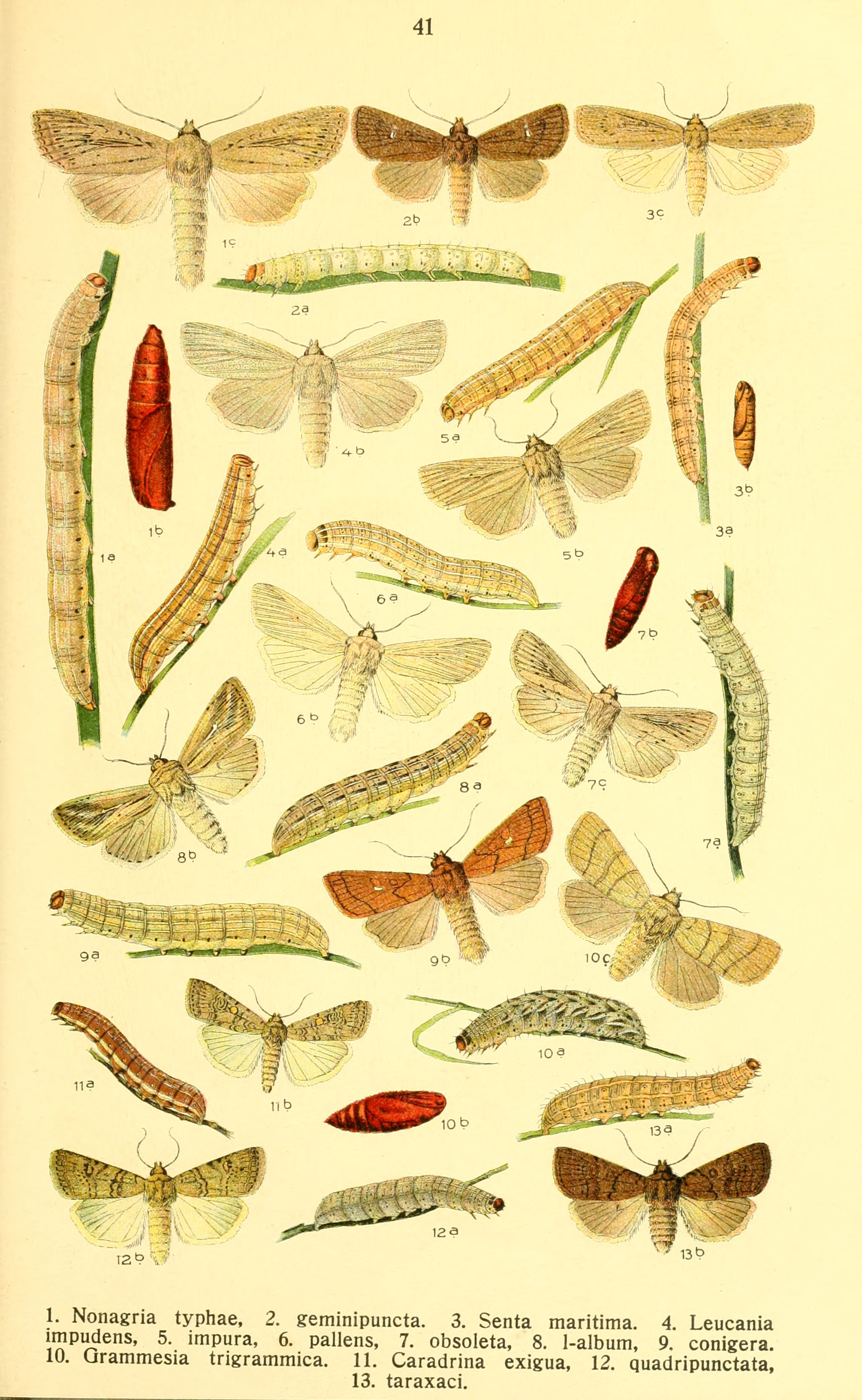
Moth, larva and pupa in Karl Eckstein Die Schmetterlinge DeutschlandsLarva and moth (figures 8a, 8b)

Larva yellowish brown; dorsal line fine, paler, with black edges; subdorsal line black, edged above with pale; below it some faint dark lines; spiracles black.

The species occurs mainly in July and again in September and October.

The species survives winter as a caterpillar when it feeds on various: Brachypodium pinnatum, Bromus inermis, Bromus sterilis, Dactylis glomerata, Deschampsia flexuosa, Elymus repens, Festuca, Festuca arundinacea, Festuca ovina, Phleum pratense, Poa annua, Poa nemoralis, Poa pratensis. Also on Rumex, Taraxacum, Plantago.
