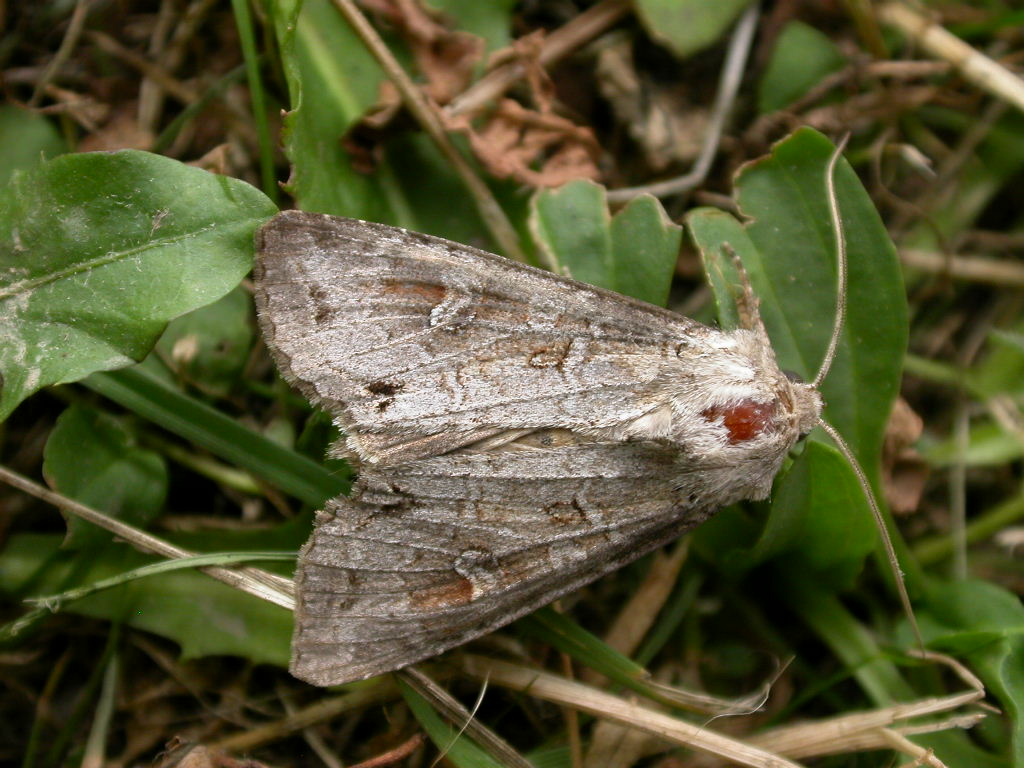
- Polia bombycina

Scientific classification
- Domain: Eukaryota
- Kingdom: Animalia
- Phylum: Arthropoda
- Class: Insecta
- Order: Lepidoptera
- Superfamily: Noctuoidea
- Family: Noctuidae
- Tribe: Hadenini
- Subtribe: Poliina
- Genus: Polia; Ochsenheimer, 1816

Synonyms
- Chera Hübner, [1821]; Aplecta Guenée, 1838; Anartodes Culot, 1915; Bompolia Beck, 1996; Ripolia Beck, 1996; Antipolia Beck, 1996

= Polia (moth) =

Genus of moths

Polia is a genus of moths of the family Noctuidae described by Ochsenheimer in 1816.

== Species ==
- Polia adustaeoides Draeseke, 1928
- Polia albomixta Draudt, 1950
- Polia altaica (Lederer, 1853)
- Polia atrax Draudt, 1950
- Polia bombycina (Hufnagel, 1766) – pale shining brown
- Polia cherrug Rakosy & Wieser, 1997
- Polia conspicua (A. Bang-Haas 1912)
- Polia culta (Moore, 1881)
- Polia discalis (Grote, 1877)
- Polia enodata (Bang-Haas, 1912)
- Polia goliath (Oberthür, 1880)
- Polia griseifusa Draudt, 1950
- Polia hepatica (Clerck, 1759) – silvery arches
- Polia ignorata (Hreblay, 1996)
- Polia imbrifera (Guenée, 1852)
- Polia kalikotei (Varga, 1992)
- Polia lamuta (Hertz, 1903)
- Polia malchani (Draudt, 1934)
- Polia mortua (Staudinger, 1888)
- Polia nebulosa (Hufnagel, 1766) – grey arches
- Polia nimbosa (Guenée, 1852)
- Polia nugatis (Smith, 1898)
- Polia piniae Buckett & Bauer, [1967]
- Polia praecipua (Staudinger, 1898)
- Polia propodea McCabe, 1980
- Polia purpurissata (Grote, 1864)
- Polia richardsoni (Curtis, 1835)
  - Polia richardsoni richardsoni (Curtis, 1834)
  - Polia richardsoni magna (Barnes & Benjamin, 1924)
- Polia rogenhoferi (Möschler, 1870) (syn: Polia leomegra (Smith, 1908), Polia carbonifera (Hampson, 1908))
- Polia scotochlora Kollar, 1844
- Polia serratilinea Ochsenheimer, 1816
- Polia similissima Plante, 1982
- Polia sublimis (Draudt, 1950)
- Polia subviolacea (Leech, 1900)
- Polia tiefi Püngeler, 1914
- Polia vespertilio (Draudt, 1934)
- Polia vesperugo Eversmann, 1856

== Former species ==
- Polia delecta is now Orthodes delecta Barnes & McDunnough, 1916
- Polia detracta is now Orthodes detracta (Walker, 1857)
- Polia vauorbicularis is now Orthodes vauorbicularis (Smith, 1902)
