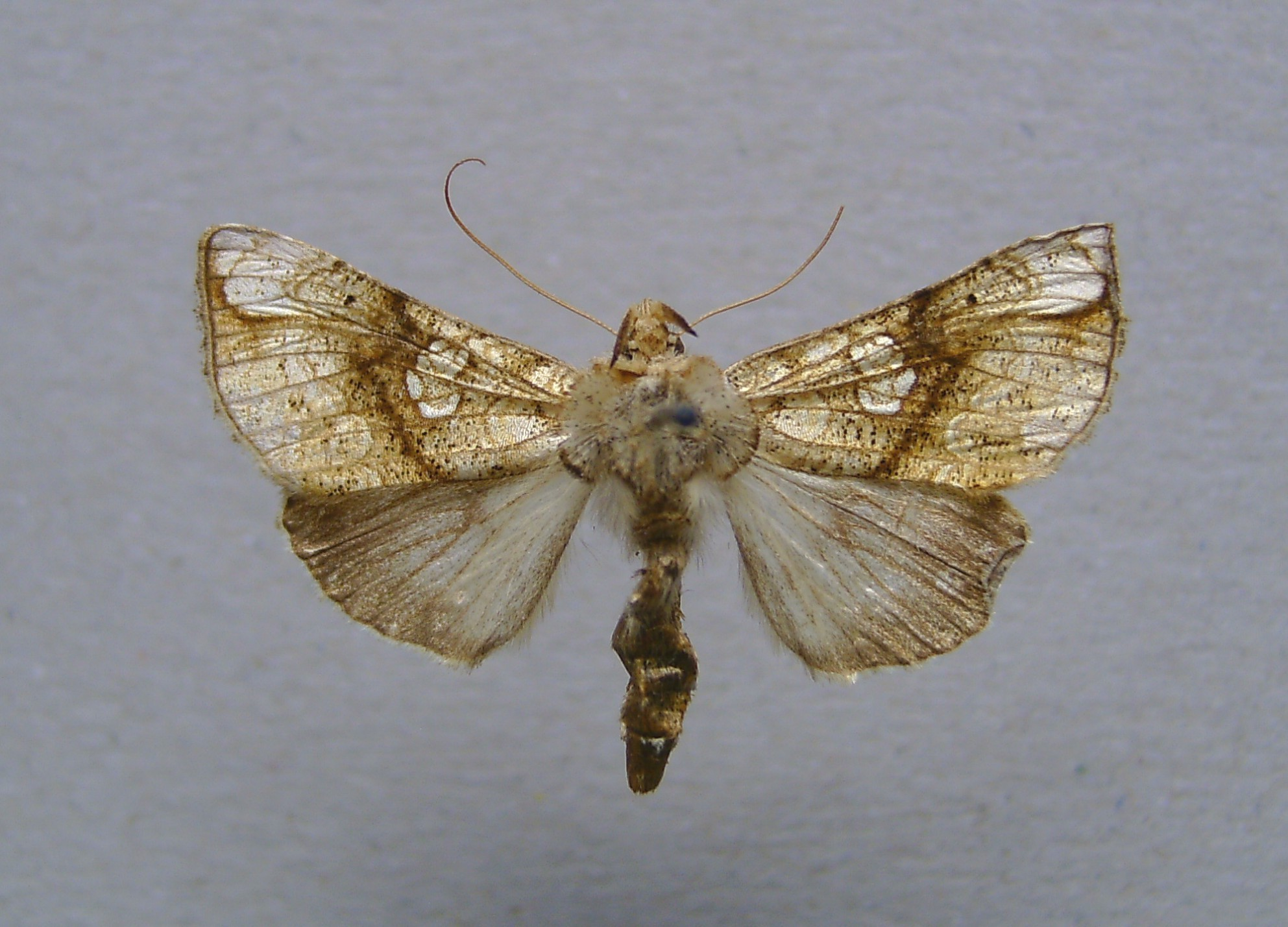

Scientific classification
- Domain: Eukaryota
- Kingdom: Animalia
- Phylum: Arthropoda
- Class: Insecta
- Order: Lepidoptera
- Superfamily: Noctuoidea
- Family: Noctuidae
- Genus: Polychrysia
- Species: P. esmeralda

Binomial name
- Polychrysia esmeralda (Oberthür, 1880)

Synonyms
- Plusia moneta var. esmeralda Oberthür, 1880; Plusia esmeralda; Deva trabea Smith, 1895

= Polychrysia esmeralda =

Delphinium leaftier

Species of moth

Polychrysia esmeralda, the delphinium leaftier (from Ancient Greek πολύς [polus] = "many", and χρυσός [khrusos] = "gold"), is a moth of the family Noctuidae. The species was originally described by Charles Oberthür in 1880. It is found in Asia (eastern Siberia) and in North America (Alaska, British Columbia, Alberta, Saskatchewan, and Manitoba). The larvae feed on monkshood (Aconitum species) and larkspur or delphinium (Delphinium species). Adults are reported to feed on the nectar of fireweed (Chamerion species).

== Description ==
Eggs are yellow. The bright green larvae move in a looper-fashion as do most Plusiinae. When the larva is fully grown it ties leaves together with silk, and within spins a gold-colored cocoon. Wings of adults have a shining golden color. Adults look similar to Polychrysia moneta, but the upperside of the wings is paler in P. moneta, and the "curved extrabasal line, below the median vein of the forewings", is simple in P. esmeralda and double in P. moneta.
