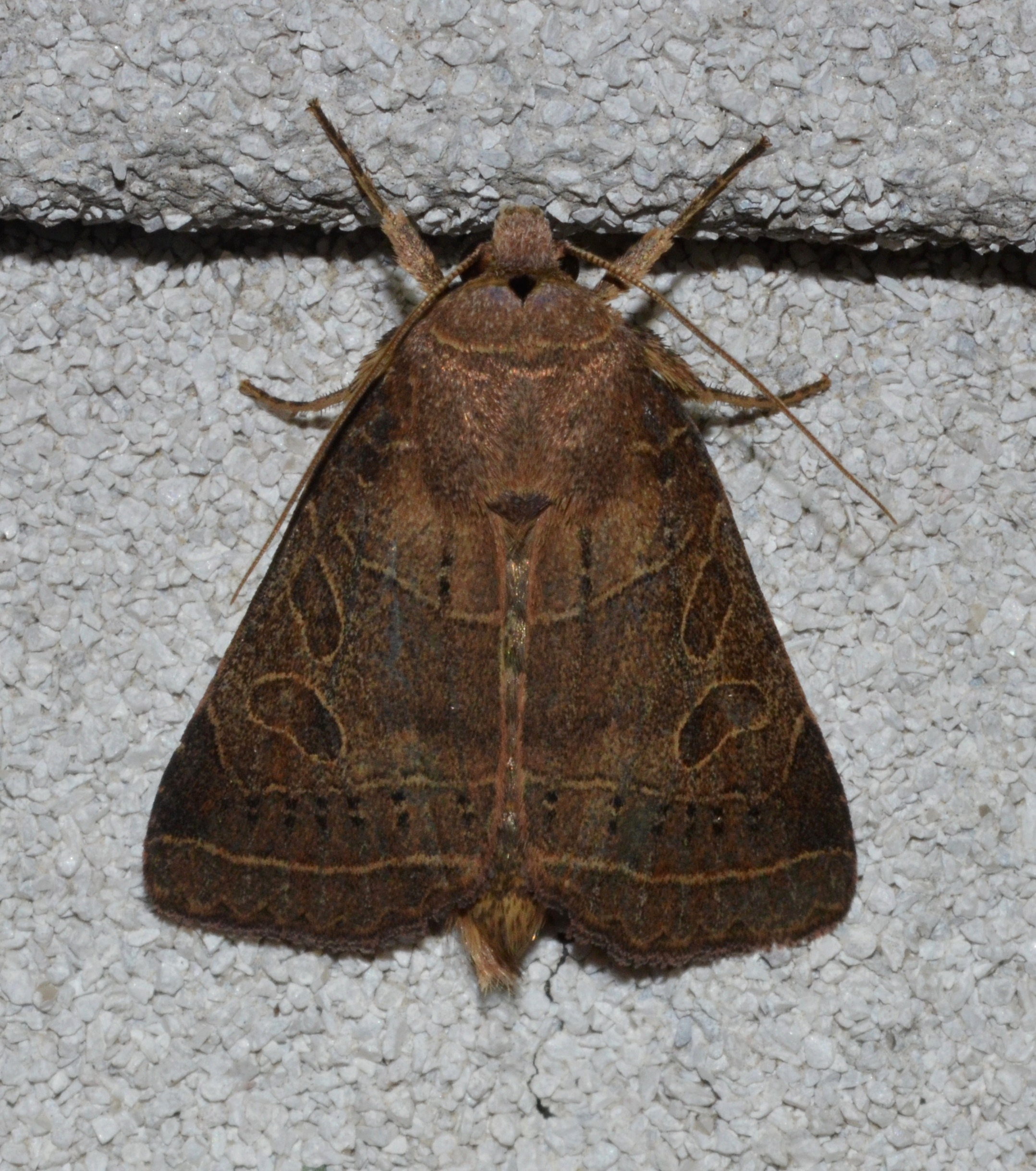
- Orthodes majuscula

Scientific classification
- Kingdom: Animalia
- Phylum: Arthropoda
- Class: Insecta
- Order: Lepidoptera
- Superfamily: Noctuoidea
- Family: Noctuidae
- Tribe: Eriopygini
- Genus: Orthodes; Guenée in Boisduval & Guenée, 1852

= Orthodes =

Genus of moths

Orthodes is a genus of moths in the family Noctuidae. Most species are found in North America.

== Species ==
- Orthodes adiastola Franclemont, 1976
- Orthodes anoatra Guenée, 1852
- Orthodes bolteri (Smith, 1900)
- Orthodes cachia (Schaus, 1911)
- Orthodes cartagensis (Schaus, 1911)
- Orthodes cracerdota (Dyar, 1913)
- Orthodes curvirena Guenée, 1852
- Orthodes cynica Guenée, 1852
- Orthodes detracta (Walker, 1857)
- Orthodes dolia (Dyar, 1913)
- Orthodes dormitosa (Dyar, 1922)
- Orthodes enages (Dyar, 1913)
- Orthodes furtiva McDunnough, 1943
- Orthodes goniostigma (Schaus, 1903)
- Orthodes goodelli (Grote, 1875)
- Orthodes infirma Guenée, 1852
- Orthodes jamaicensis (Hampson, 1905)
- Orthodes lanaris (Butler, 1890)
- Orthodes lobata (Hampson, 1905)
- Orthodes lodebar Druce, 1889
- Orthodes loliopopa (Dyar, 1913)
- Orthodes majuscula Herrich-Schäffer, 1868 (syn: Orthodes crenulata (Butler, 1890))
- Orthodes moderata (Walker, 1857)
- Orthodes nocanoca (Dyar, 1919)
- Orthodes noverca (Grote, 1878) (=Orthodes delecta Barnes & McDunnough, 1916, Orthodes vauorbicularis (Smith, 1902) )
- Orthodes oache (Dyar, 1913)
- Orthodes obscura (Smith, 1888)
- Orthodes orbica (Hampson, 1905)
- Orthodes turrialba (Schaus, 1911)
- Orthodes ultimella (Dyar, 1913)
- Orthodes vesquesa (Dyar, 1913)
