= Orthodes adiastola =

Scientific classification
- Kingdom: Animalia
- Phylum: Arthropoda
- Clade: Pancrustacea
- Class: Insecta
- Order: Lepidoptera
- Superfamily: Noctuoidea
- Family: Noctuidae
- Genus: Orthodes
- Species: O. adiastola

Binomial name
- Orthodes adiastola Franclemont, 1976

Species of moth

Orthodes adiastola is a species of cutworm or dart moth in the family Noctuidae. It is found in North America.
