= Polychrysia aurata =

Scientific classification
- Domain: Eukaryota
- Kingdom: Animalia
- Phylum: Arthropoda
- Class: Insecta
- Order: Lepidoptera
- Superfamily: Noctuoidea
- Family: Noctuidae
- Genus: Polychrysia
- Species: P. aurata

Binomial name
- Polychrysia aurata Staudinger, 1888

Synonyms
- Plusia aurata

Species of moth

Polychrysia aurata is a moth of the family Noctuidae. It is found in the Japan, Russia (including Siberia) and recently also China.

The wingspan is 33–37 mm.
