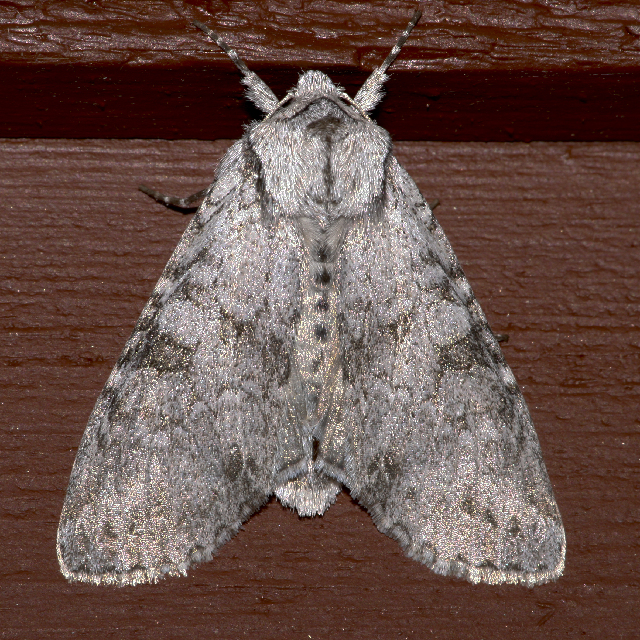

Scientific classification
- Domain: Eukaryota
- Kingdom: Animalia
- Phylum: Arthropoda
- Class: Insecta
- Order: Lepidoptera
- Superfamily: Noctuoidea
- Family: Noctuidae
- Subtribe: Poliina
- Genus: Polia
- Species: P. piniae

Binomial name
- Polia piniae Buckett & Bauer, 1967

= Polia piniae =

Species of moth

Polia piniae, the piney moth, is a species of cutworm or dart moth in the family Noctuidae. It is found in North America.

The MONA or Hodges number for Polia piniae is 10274.
