= Polychrysia morigera =

Scientific classification
- Domain: Eukaryota
- Kingdom: Animalia
- Phylum: Arthropoda
- Class: Insecta
- Order: Lepidoptera
- Superfamily: Noctuoidea
- Family: Noctuidae
- Genus: Polychrysia
- Species: P. morigera

Binomial name
- Polychrysia morigera (H. Edwards, 1886)

Synonyms
- Deva morigera H. Edwards, 1886

Species of moth

Polychrysia morigera, the disjunct looper, is a moth of the family Noctuidae. The species was first described by Henry Edwards in 1886. In the east of North America, it is found in the Mississippi, Missouri, and Ohio river valleys from Pennsylvania to Tennessee. In the Rocky Mountains it is found from Montana to Colorado and on the west coast it occurs from Oregon to northern California. It is the rarest of the North American Plusiinae species.

The wingspan is 28–31 mm. Adults are on wing from June to July.

The larvae have only been recorded on Delphinium trolliifolium. Covell and Medley (1986) reported adults trapped in the labellum of Cypripedium kentuckiense.
