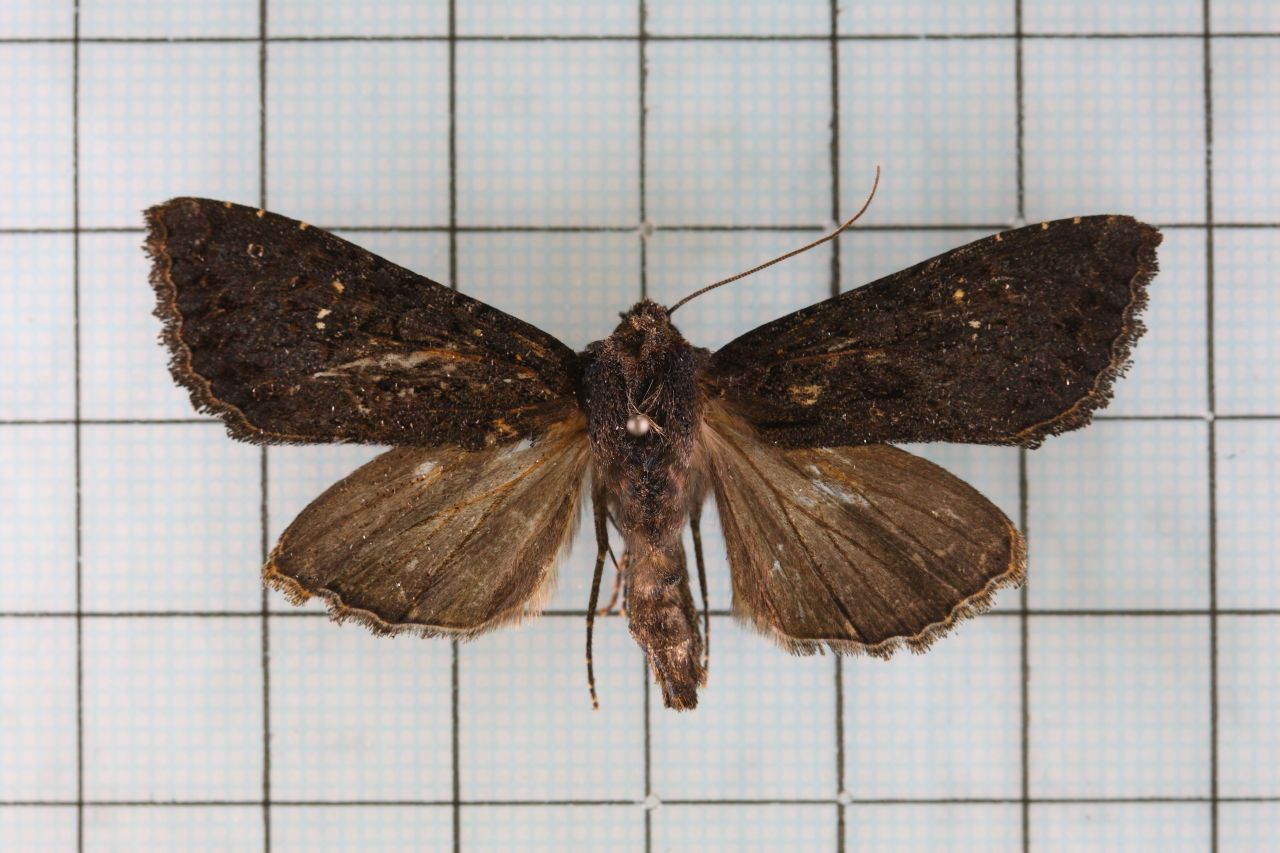
- Polia mortua caeca

Scientific classification
- Domain: Eukaryota
- Kingdom: Animalia
- Phylum: Arthropoda
- Class: Insecta
- Order: Lepidoptera
- Superfamily: Noctuoidea
- Family: Noctuidae
- Genus: Polia
- Species: P. mortua

Binomial name
- Polia mortua (Staudinger, 1888)

Synonyms
- Mamestra mortua Staudinger, 1888; Mamestra afra Graeser, 1889; Hadena kala Swinhoe, 1900; Polia persicariae minorita Bryk, 1949; Mamestra nigerrima Warren, 1888; Polia szetschwana Draeseke, 1928

= Polia mortua =

Species of moth

Polia mortua is a species of moth of the family Noctuidae. It is found in the Russian Far East, Korea, Japan and Taiwan.

== Subspecies ==
- Polia mortua mortua
- Polia mortua caeca Hreblay & Ronkay, 1997 (Taiwan)
