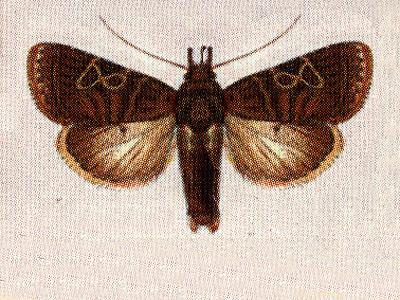

Scientific classification
- Kingdom: Animalia
- Phylum: Arthropoda
- Class: Insecta
- Order: Lepidoptera
- Superfamily: Noctuoidea
- Family: Noctuidae
- Genus: Orthodes
- Species: O. jamaicensis

Binomial name
- Orthodes jamaicensis (Hampson, 1905)

Synonyms
- Eriopyga jamaicensis Hampson, 1905

= Orthodes jamaicensis =

Species of moth

Orthodes jamaicensis is a moth of the family Noctuidae. It is found on Jamaica.

== Taxonomy ==
Its name Jamaicensis refers to how it mainly inhabits Jamaica.
