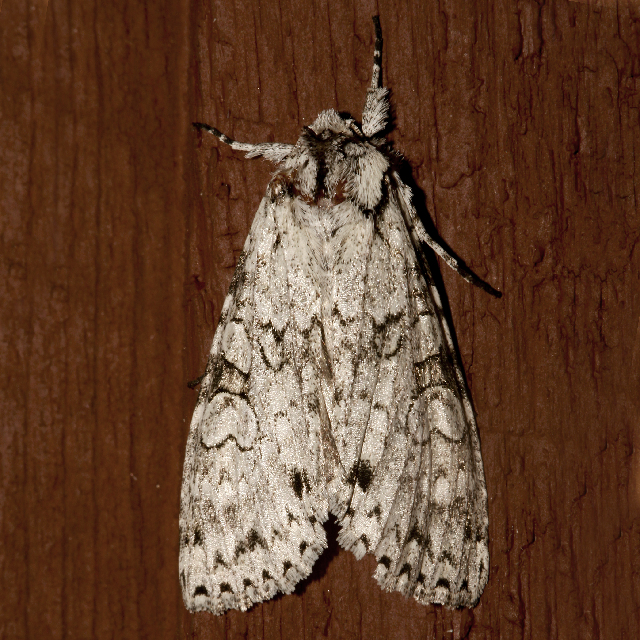

Scientific classification
- Kingdom: Animalia
- Phylum: Arthropoda
- Class: Insecta
- Order: Lepidoptera
- Superfamily: Noctuoidea
- Family: Noctuidae
- Subtribe: Poliina
- Genus: Polia
- Species: P. nimbosa

Binomial name
- Polia nimbosa (Guenée, 1852)

= Polia nimbosa =

Species of moth

Polia nimbosa, the stormy arches, is a species of cutworm or dart moth in the family Noctuidae. It is found in North America.

The MONA or Hodges number for Polia nimbosa is 10275.

== Subspecies ==
These three subspecies belong to the species Polia nimbosa:

- Polia nimbosa mystica Smith, 1898
- Polia nimbosa mysticoides Barnes & Benjamin, 1924
- Polia nimbosa nimbosa
