= Orthodes obscura =

Scientific classification
- Domain: Eukaryota
- Kingdom: Animalia
- Phylum: Arthropoda
- Class: Insecta
- Order: Lepidoptera
- Superfamily: Noctuoidea
- Family: Noctuidae
- Tribe: Eriopygini
- Genus: Orthodes
- Species: O. obscura

Binomial name
- Orthodes obscura (Smith, 1888)

Species of moth

Orthodes obscura is a species of cutworm or dart moth in the family Noctuidae. It is found in North America.

The MONA or Hodges number for Orthodes obscura is 10290.
