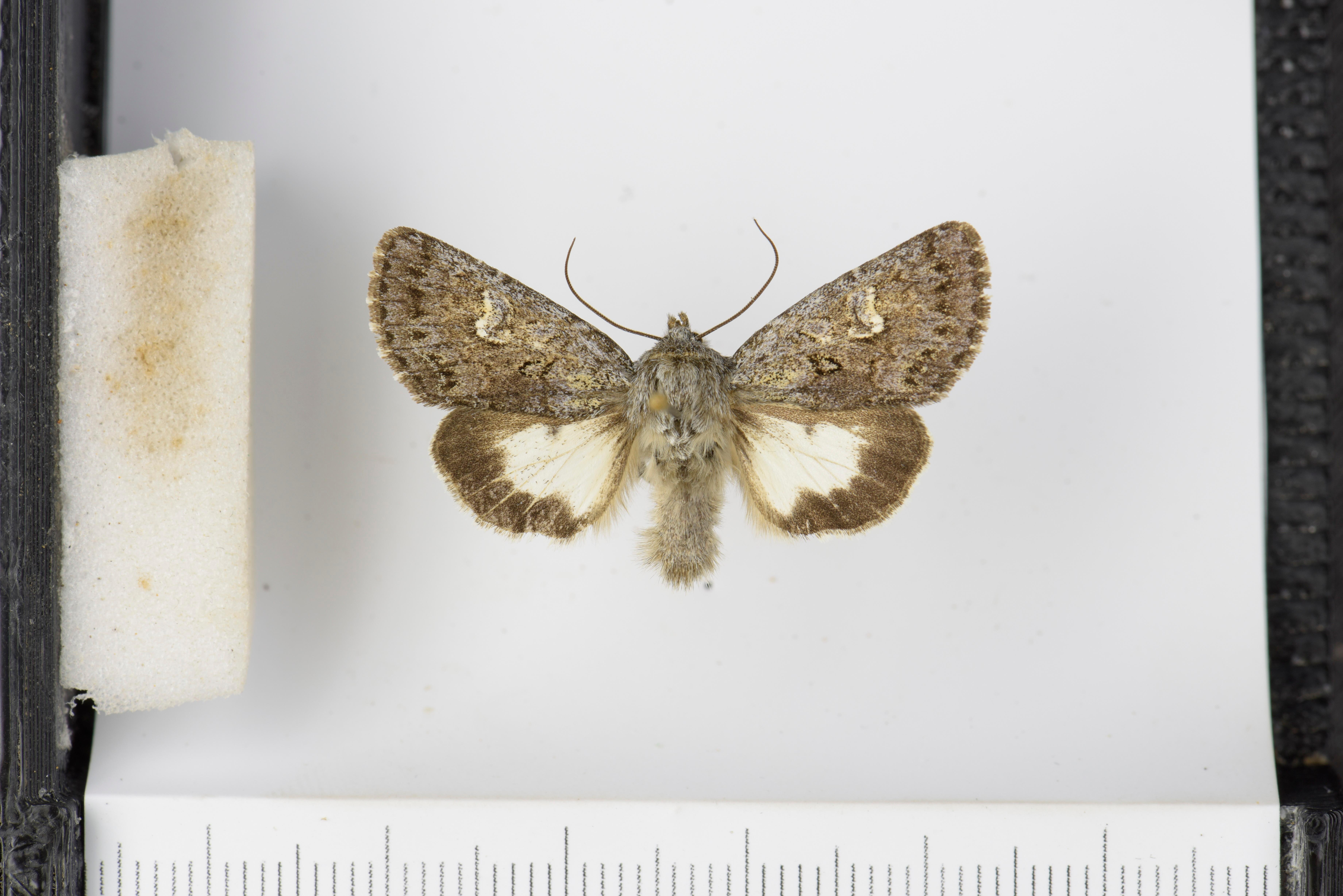

Scientific classification
- Domain: Eukaryota
- Kingdom: Animalia
- Phylum: Arthropoda
- Class: Insecta
- Order: Lepidoptera
- Superfamily: Noctuoidea
- Family: Noctuidae
- Genus: Polia
- Species: P. lamuta

Binomial name
- Polia lamuta (Herz, 1903)

= Polia lamuta =

Species of moth

Polia lamuta is a species of moth belonging to the family Noctuidae.

Synonym:

- Anarta lamuta Herz, 1903 (= basionym)
