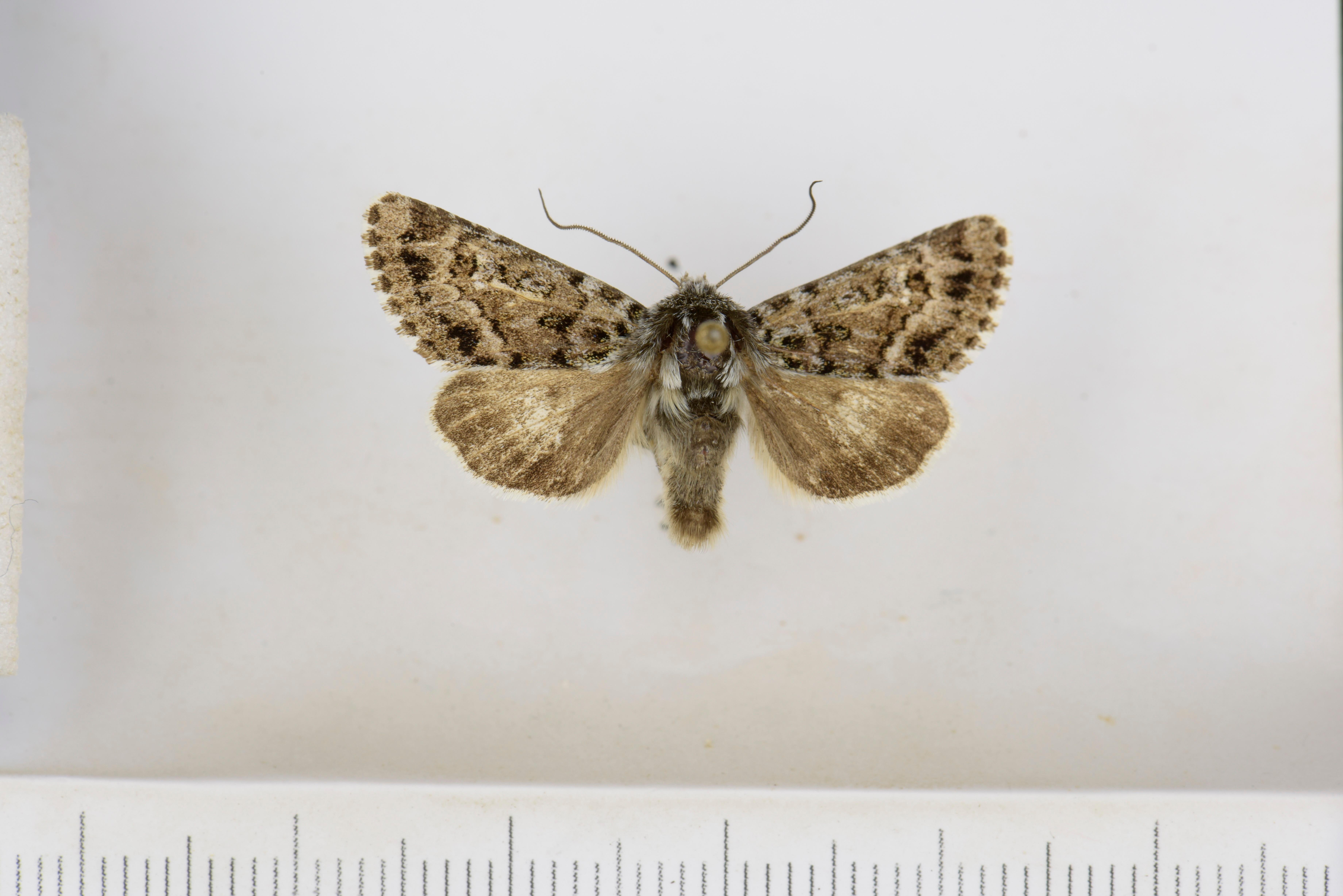

Scientific classification
- Kingdom: Animalia
- Phylum: Arthropoda
- Clade: Pancrustacea
- Class: Insecta
- Order: Lepidoptera
- Superfamily: Noctuoidea
- Family: Noctuidae
- Subtribe: Poliina
- Genus: Polia
- Species: P. richardsoni

Binomial name
- Polia richardsoni (Curtis, 1834)

= Polia richardsoni =

Species of moth

Polia richardsoni is a species of cutworm or dart moth in the family Noctuidae first described by John Curtis in 1834. It is found in North America.

== Subspecies ==
Two subspecies belong to Polia richardsoni:

- Polia richardsoni magna (Barnes & Benjamin, 1924)^{i g}
- Polia richardsoni richardsoni (Curtis, 1834)^{i g}

Data sources: i = ITIS, c = Catalogue of Life, g = GBIF, b = Bugguide.net
