= Polychrysia splendida =

Scientific classification
- Domain: Eukaryota
- Kingdom: Animalia
- Phylum: Arthropoda
- Class: Insecta
- Order: Lepidoptera
- Superfamily: Noctuoidea
- Family: Noctuidae
- Genus: Polychrysia
- Species: P. splendida

Binomial name
- Polychrysia splendida Butler, 1878

Synonyms
- Deva splendida; Plusia intracta; Phytometra sachaliensis

Species of moth

Polychrysia splendida is a moth of the family Noctuidae. It is found in the Japan, Russia, Korea, northern Mongolia and recently also China.

The wingspan is 28–30 mm.
