= Polia rogenhoferi =

Scientific classification
- Domain: Eukaryota
- Kingdom: Animalia
- Phylum: Arthropoda
- Class: Insecta
- Order: Lepidoptera
- Superfamily: Noctuoidea
- Family: Noctuidae
- Subtribe: Poliina
- Genus: Polia
- Species: P. rogenhoferi

Binomial name
- Polia rogenhoferi (Moschler, 1870)

Synonyms
- Polia carbonifera (Hampson, 1908); Polia leomegra (Smith, 1908)

Species of moth

Polia rogenhoferi is a species of cutworm or dart moth in the family Noctuidae. It is found in North America.

The MONA or Hodges number for Polia rogenhoferi is 10277.
