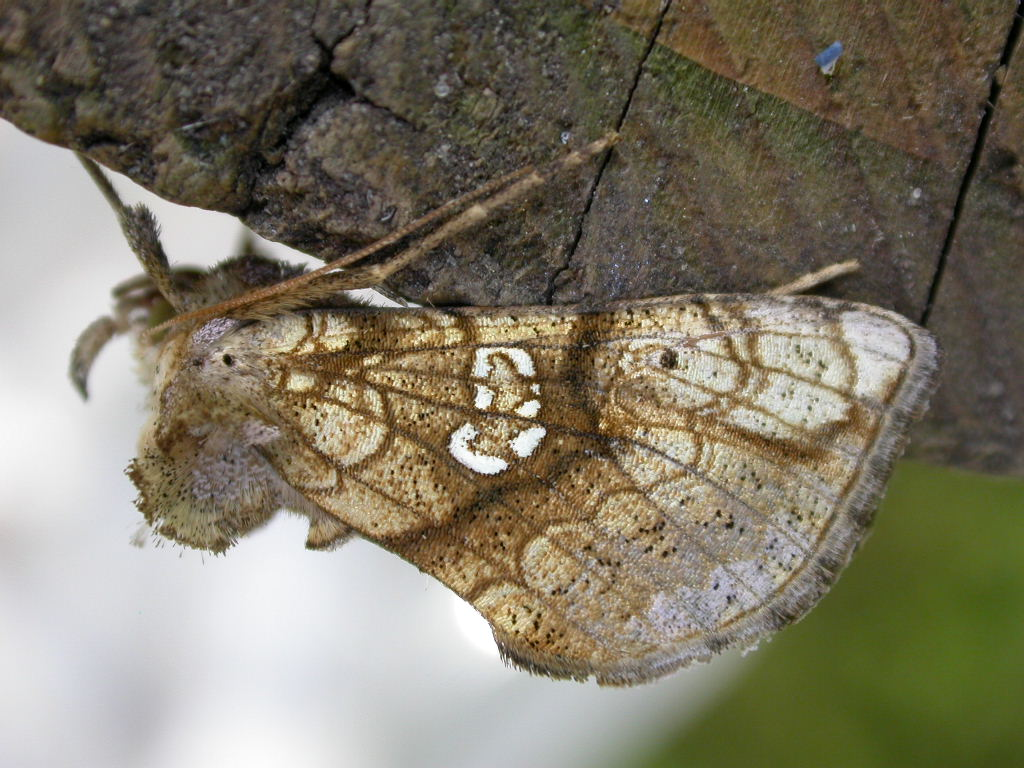
- Polychrysia moneta

Scientific classification
- Kingdom: Animalia
- Phylum: Arthropoda
- Clade: Pancrustacea
- Class: Insecta
- Order: Lepidoptera
- Superfamily: Noctuoidea
- Family: Noctuidae
- Subfamily: Plusiinae
- Genus: Polychrysia; Hübner, [1821]

= Polychrysia =

Genus of moths

Polychrysia is a genus of moths of the family Noctuidae. More commonly known as owlet moths.

== Distribution ==
Polychrysia can be found in Russia, Canada, USA, Europe, and East Asia.

== Species ==
- Polychrysia aurata Staudinger, 1888
- Polychrysia esmeralda Oberthür, 1880
- Polychrysia hampsoni Leech, 1900
- Polychrysia imperatrix Draudt, 1950
- Polychrysia marmorea Ronkay, 1986
- Polychrysia moneta – Golden Plusia Fabricius, 1787
- Polychrysia morigera H. Edwards, 1886
- Polychrysia sica Graeser, 1890
- Polychrysia splendida Butler, 1878
