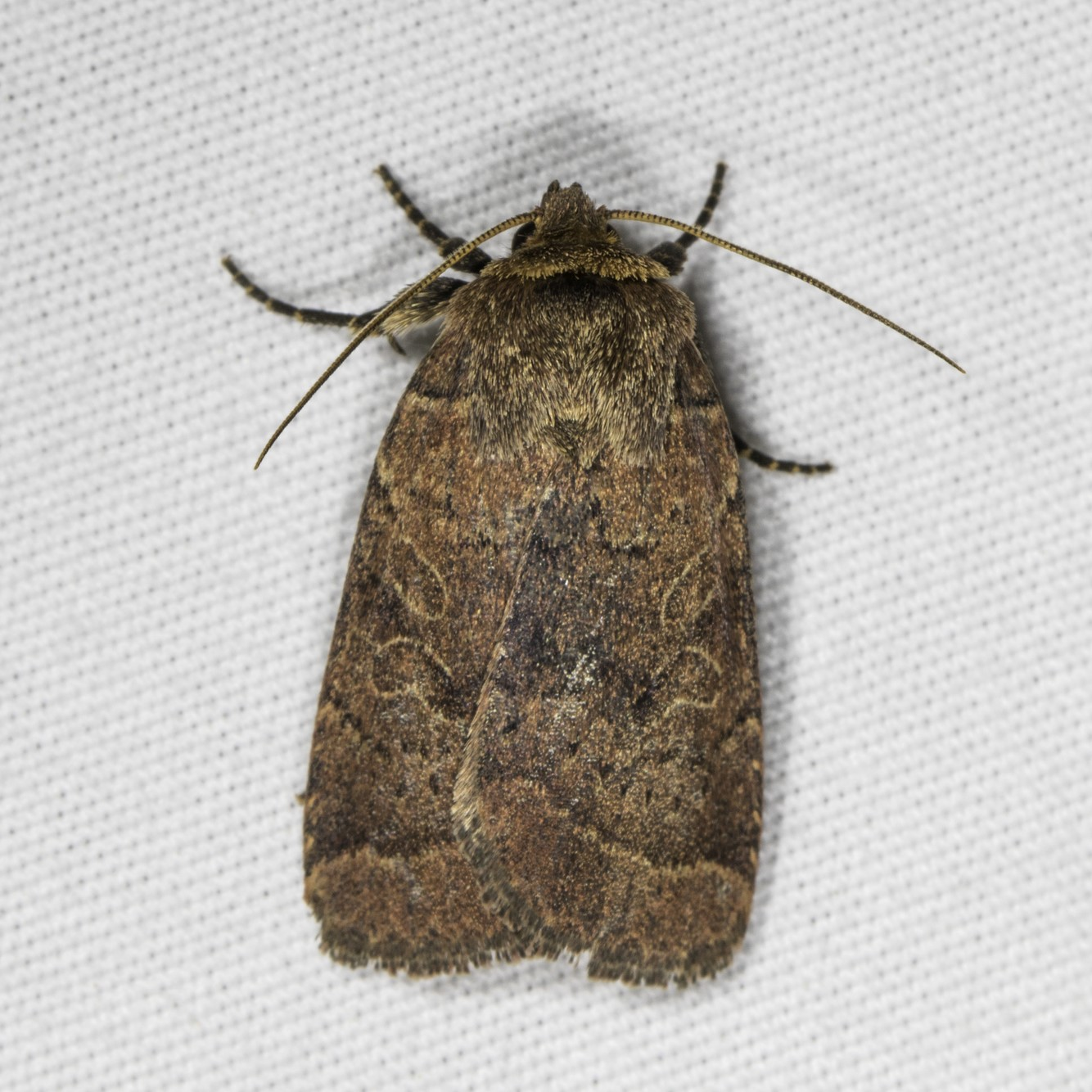

Scientific classification
- Kingdom: Animalia
- Phylum: Arthropoda
- Class: Insecta
- Order: Lepidoptera
- Superfamily: Noctuoidea
- Family: Noctuidae
- Tribe: Eriopygini
- Genus: Orthodes
- Species: O. cynica

Binomial name
- Orthodes cynica Guenée, 1852

= Orthodes cynica =

Species of moth

Orthodes cynica, the cynical Quaker, is a species of cutworm or dart moth in the family Noctuidae. It is found in North America.
