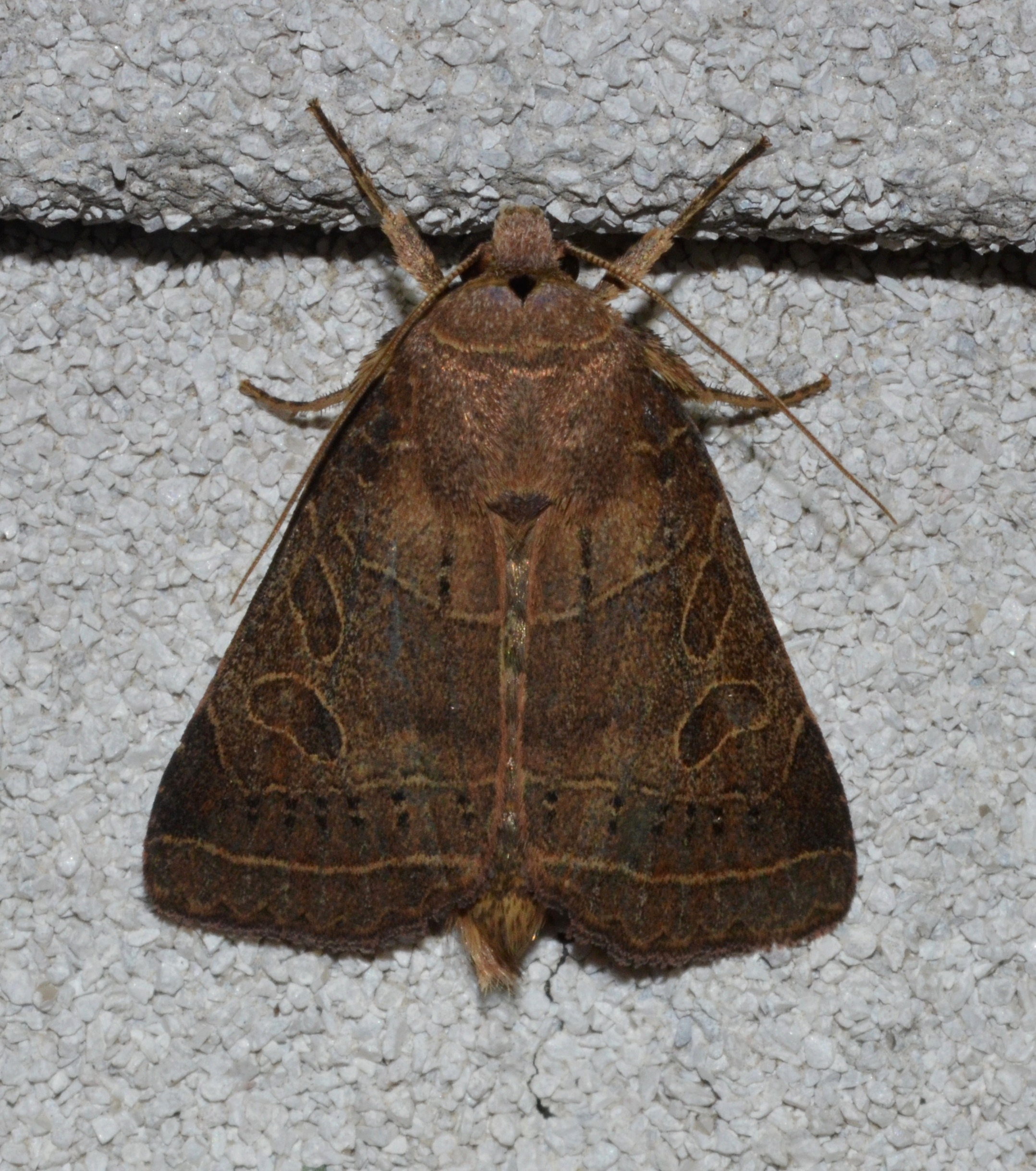

Scientific classification
- Domain: Eukaryota
- Kingdom: Animalia
- Phylum: Arthropoda
- Class: Insecta
- Order: Lepidoptera
- Superfamily: Noctuoidea
- Family: Noctuidae
- Genus: Orthodes
- Species: O. majuscula

Binomial name
- Orthodes majuscula Herrich-Schäffer, 1868

Synonyms
- Dyschorista crenulata Butler, 1890; Orthodes crenulata; Eriopyga vesquesa Dyar, 1913

= Orthodes majuscula =

Species of moth

Orthodes majuscula, the rustic Quaker, is a moth of the family Noctuidae. The species was first described by Gottlieb August Wilhelm Herrich-Schäffer in 1868. It is widespread throughout the New World, including eastern North America (from Nova Scotia to Florida, west to Arizona, north to Alberta), Cuba, Mexico, Costa Rica and Brazil.

The wingspan is 28–35 mm. Adults are on wing from May to August.

The larvae feed on a wide range of plants, including dandelion, plantain, grasses and willow.
