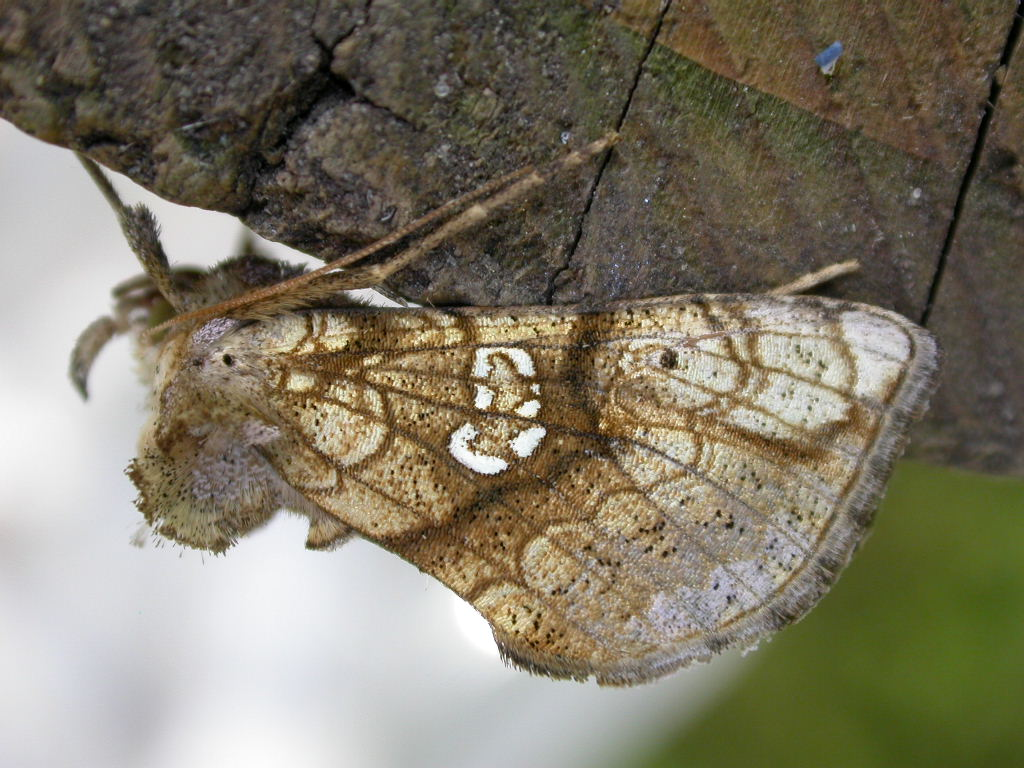

Scientific classification
- Kingdom: Animalia
- Phylum: Arthropoda
- Clade: Pancrustacea
- Class: Insecta
- Order: Lepidoptera
- Superfamily: Noctuoidea
- Family: Noctuidae
- Genus: Polychrysia
- Species: P. moneta

Binomial name
- Polychrysia moneta (Fabricius, 1787)

= Polychrysia moneta =

Species of moth

Polychrysia moneta, the golden plusia, is a moth of the family Noctuidae. It is found in the Palearctic realm (Europe, Asia Minor, Turkey, Armenia, Azerbaijan, Caucasus, and northwest Iran).

== Technical description and variation ==
The wingspan is 32–37 mm. Forewing pale golden, diffusely tinged in median area with brown and sprinkled with black scales; the veins brown; the median shade conspicuously dark brown, thick, angled in middle: lines brown, double; the inner acutely angled on subcostal, below middle inwardly curved; outer line lunulate dentate; basal area flaked with golden scales; a pale golden apical blotch, cut and edged below by the brown submarginal line, which is rarely plain below middle; orbicular stigma large, oblique, horseshoe-shaped, with broad silvery outline and gold and brown centre, coalescing with a similar but inverted mark on vein 2; reniform hardly traceable; hindwing shining fuscous;the fringe pale.

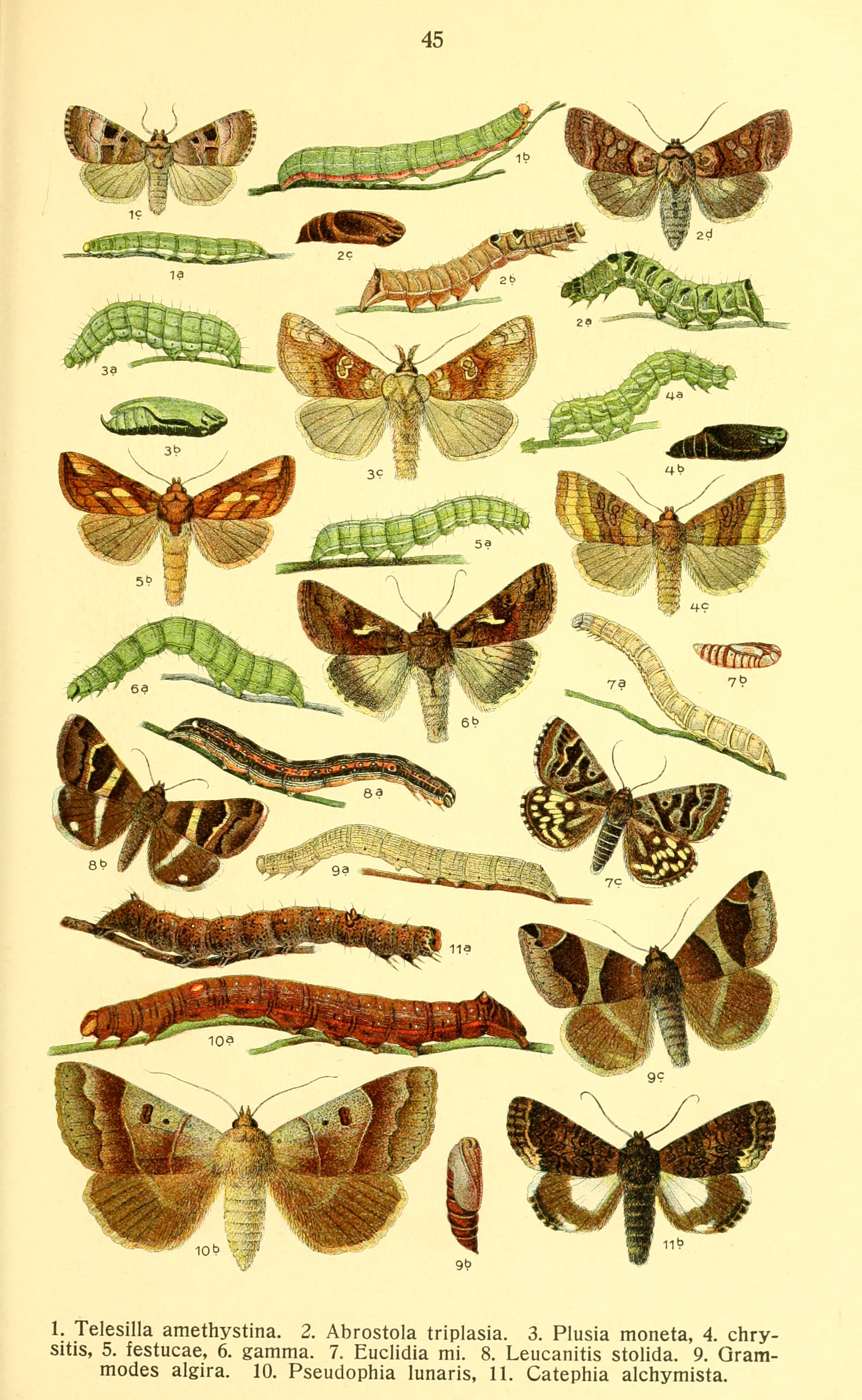
Moth, larva and pupa in Karl Eckstein Die Schmetterlinge DeutschlandsLarva, pupa and moth (figure 4)

== Biology ==
The moth flies from May to October depending on the location.

Larva dull dark green, black spotted, living when young in the heart of the central shoots; later, with dark dorsal vessel, limited by several whitish lines and a white lateral line. The larvae feed on Delphinium, Artemisia absinthium and Artemisia vulgaris.
