= Polia nugatis =

Scientific classification
- Kingdom: Animalia
- Phylum: Arthropoda
- Clade: Pancrustacea
- Class: Insecta
- Order: Lepidoptera
- Superfamily: Noctuoidea
- Family: Noctuidae
- Subtribe: Poliina
- Genus: Polia
- Species: P. nugatis

Binomial name
- Polia nugatis (Smith, 1898)

Species of moth

Polia nugatis is a species of cutworm or dart moth in the family Noctuidae. It is found in North America.

The MONA or Hodges number for Polia nugatis is 10281.
