= Orthodes furtiva =

Scientific classification
- Kingdom: Animalia
- Phylum: Arthropoda
- Clade: Pancrustacea
- Class: Insecta
- Order: Lepidoptera
- Superfamily: Noctuoidea
- Family: Noctuidae
- Genus: Orthodes
- Species: O. furtiva

Binomial name
- Orthodes furtiva McDunnough, 1943

Species of moth

Orthodes furtiva is a species of cutworm or dart moth in the family Noctuidae. It is found in North America.
