= Polia conspicua =

Scientific classification
- Domain: Eukaryota
- Kingdom: Animalia
- Phylum: Arthropoda
- Class: Insecta
- Order: Lepidoptera
- Superfamily: Noctuoidea
- Family: Noctuidae
- Genus: Polia
- Species: P. conspicua

Binomial name
- Polia conspicua A.Bang-Haas, 1912

Species of moth

Polia conspicua is a species of moth belonging to the family Noctuidae.

It is native to Northern Europe.
