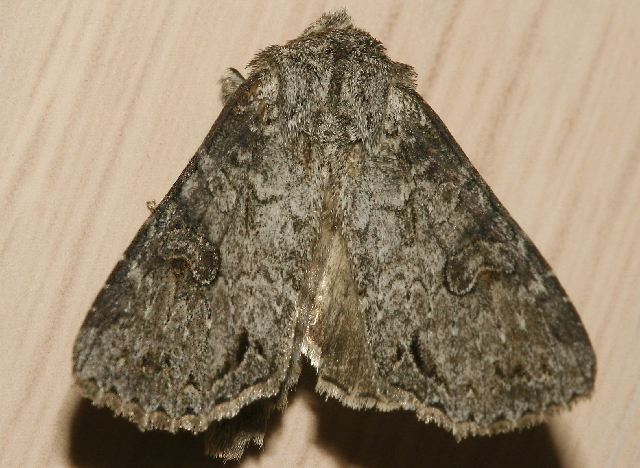

Scientific classification
- Kingdom: Animalia
- Phylum: Arthropoda
- Clade: Pancrustacea
- Class: Insecta
- Order: Lepidoptera
- Superfamily: Noctuoidea
- Family: Noctuidae
- Genus: Polia
- Species: P. purpurissata

Binomial name
- Polia purpurissata (Grote, 1864)

= Polia purpurissata =

Species of moth

Purple arches moth in Montana

Polia purpurissata, the purple arches, is a species of cutworm or dart moth in the family Noctuidae. It is found in North America.

The MONA or Hodges number for Polia purpurissata is 10280.
