= Orthodes noverca =

Scientific classification
- Kingdom: Animalia
- Phylum: Arthropoda
- Clade: Pancrustacea
- Class: Insecta
- Order: Lepidoptera
- Superfamily: Noctuoidea
- Family: Noctuidae
- Genus: Orthodes
- Species: O. noverca

Binomial name
- Orthodes noverca (Grote, 1878)

Synonyms
- Orthodes delecta (Barnes & McDunnough, 1916); Orthodes vauorbicularis (Smith, 1902)

Species of moth

Orthodes noverca is a species of cutworm or dart moth in the family Noctuidae first described by Augustus Radcliffe Grote in 1878. It is found in North America.

The MONA or Hodges number for Orthodes noverca is 10282.
