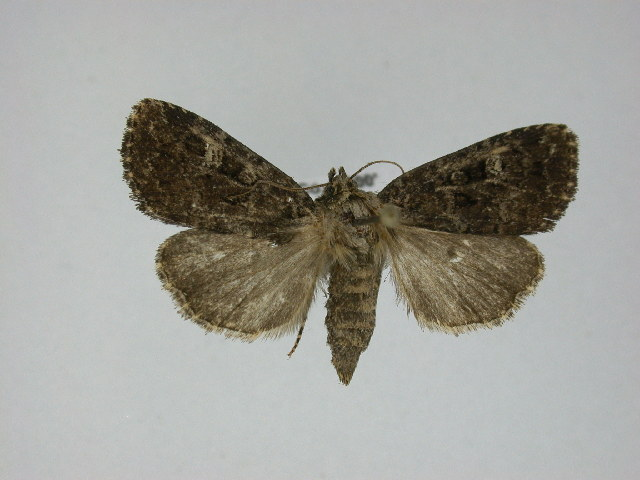

Scientific classification
- Domain: Eukaryota
- Kingdom: Animalia
- Phylum: Arthropoda
- Class: Insecta
- Order: Lepidoptera
- Superfamily: Noctuoidea
- Family: Noctuidae
- Genus: Orthodes
- Species: O. goodelli

Binomial name
- Orthodes goodelli (Grote, 1875)

= Orthodes goodelli =

Species of moth

Orthodes goodelli, or Goodell's arches moth, is a species of cutworm or dart moth in the family Noctuidae.

The MONA or Hodges number for Orthodes goodelli is 10289.
