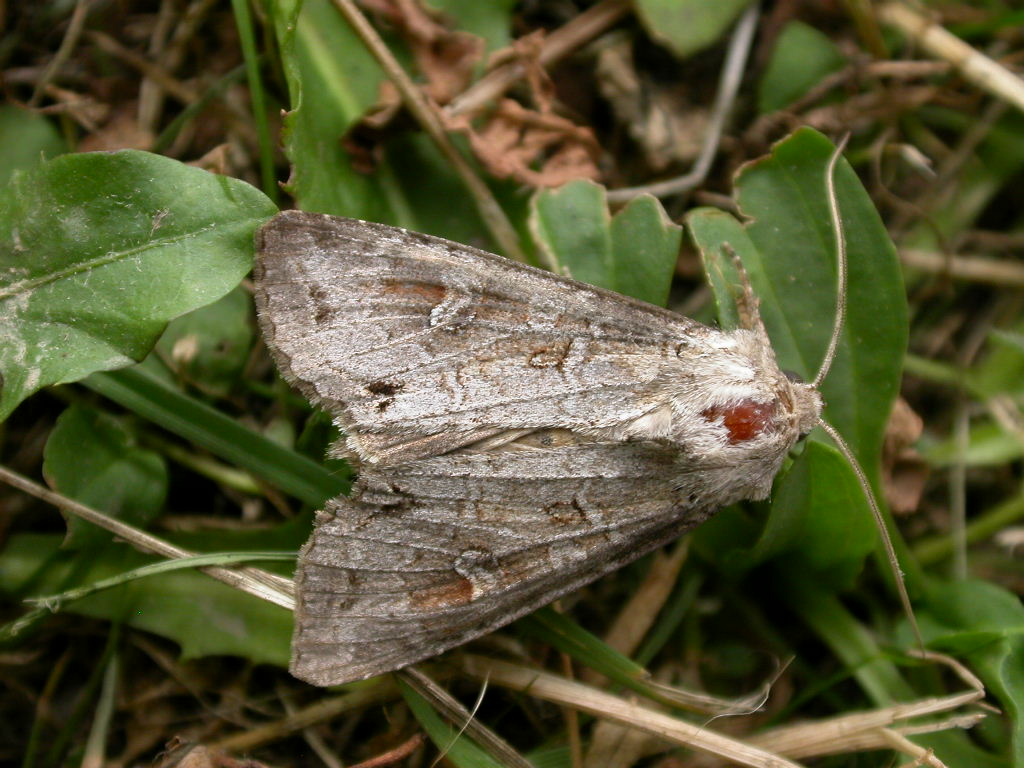

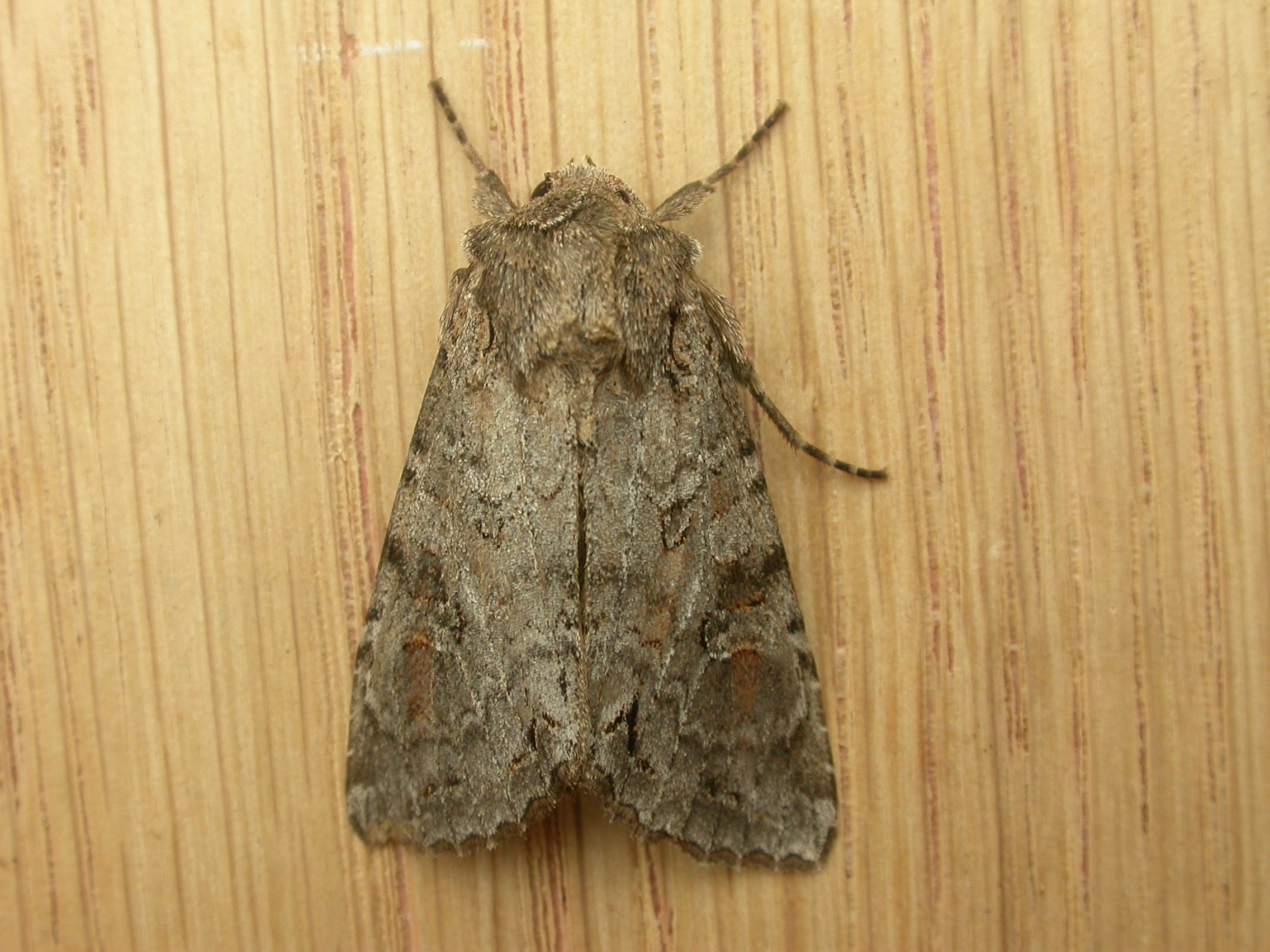

Scientific classification
- Domain: Eukaryota
- Kingdom: Animalia
- Phylum: Arthropoda
- Class: Insecta
- Order: Lepidoptera
- Superfamily: Noctuoidea
- Family: Noctuidae
- Genus: Polia
- Species: P. bombycina

Binomial name
- Polia bombycina (Hufnagel, 1766)

= Polia bombycina =

Pale shining brown

Species of moth

Polia bombycina (pale shining brown) is a moth of the family Noctuidae. It is found in the Palearctic realm from Ireland to Japan including the Russian Far East and Siberia.

== Technical description and variation ==
The wingspan is 43–52 mm. Forewing pale or dark lilac grey, more or less suffused with grey brown, especially in costal half; a slight dark basal streak below median vein; claviform stigma outlined with black: orbicular and reniform large, paler, with dark centres; reniform with white on outer edge and often followed by a rufous patch; submarginal line preceded by blackish wedge-shaped marks, and acutely indented on submedian fold; hindwing brownish fuscous; — specimens in which the glaucous tint predominates are ab. nitens Haw.; — the much rarer uniformly reddish brown form is unicolor Tutt - flavescens Spul., from the Bukowina, has the forewings pale brownish yellow; — ab. mongolica Stgr. the common form in central and eastern Asia is uniformly darker grey brown with a reddish undertone, the submarginal line equally distinctly indented.

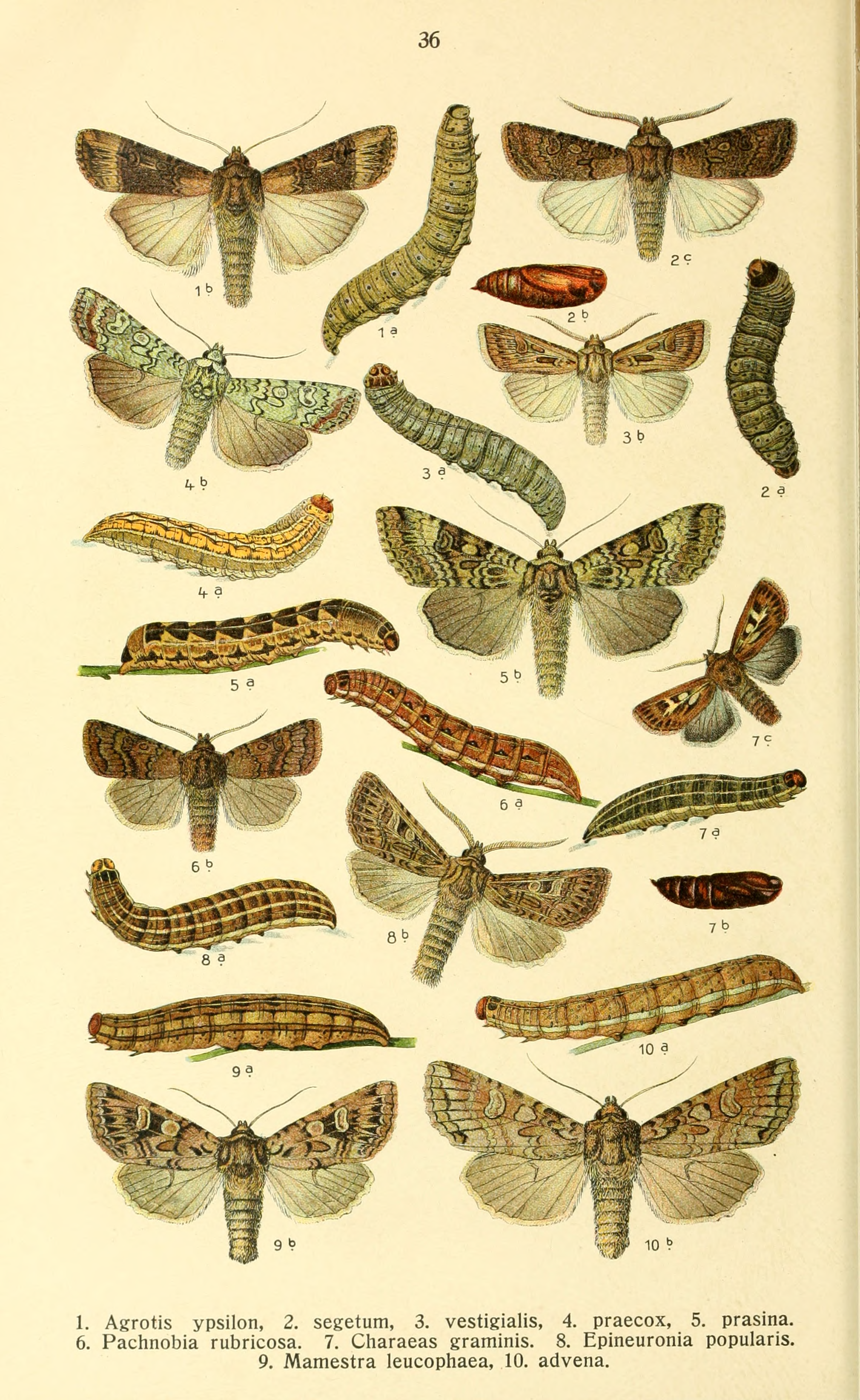
Moth and larva in Karl Eckstein Die Schmetterlinge DeutschlandsLarva and moth (figures 10a, 10b)

== Biology ==
The moth flies from May to July depending on the location.

Larva pale brown; dorsal line pale; some dark oblique streaks; a whitish dark -mottled lateral line containing the spiracles which are bright red-brown, edged with black. The larvae feed on various herbaceous plants - Betula sp., Alnus incana, Sorbus aucuparia, Prunus padus, Pimpinella saxifraga, Angelica silvestris, Galium verum, Leucanthemum vulgare, Artemisia campestris, Artemesia absinthium, Artemesia vulgaris, Hieracium umbellatum.
