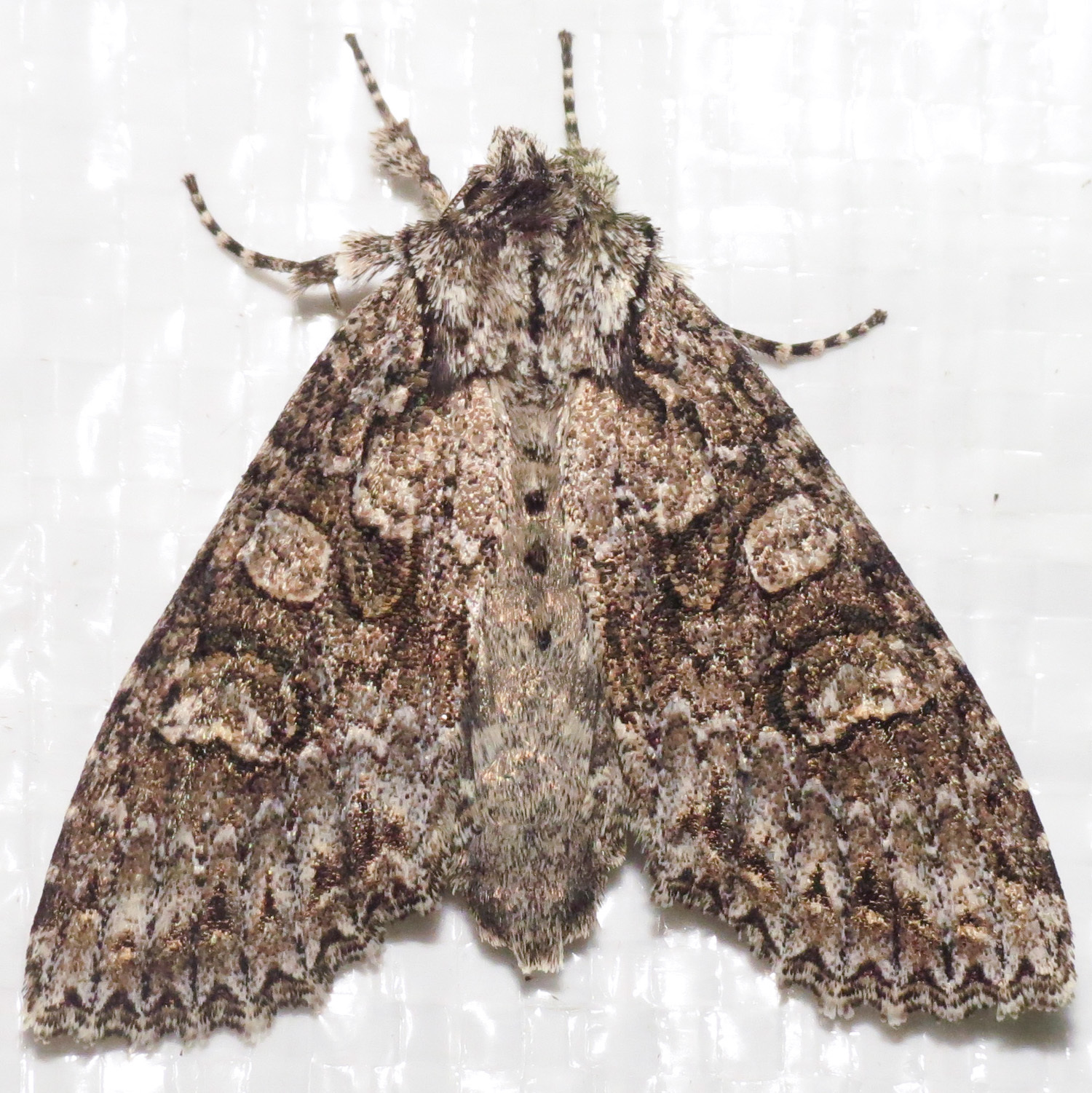

Scientific classification
- Kingdom: Animalia
- Phylum: Arthropoda
- Clade: Pancrustacea
- Class: Insecta
- Order: Lepidoptera
- Superfamily: Noctuoidea
- Family: Noctuidae
- Subtribe: Poliina
- Genus: Polia
- Species: P. imbrifera

Binomial name
- Polia imbrifera (Guenée, 1852)

= Polia imbrifera =

Cloudy arches

Species of moth

Polia imbrifera, the cloudy arches, is a species of cutworm or dart moth in the family Noctuidae. It is found in North America.
