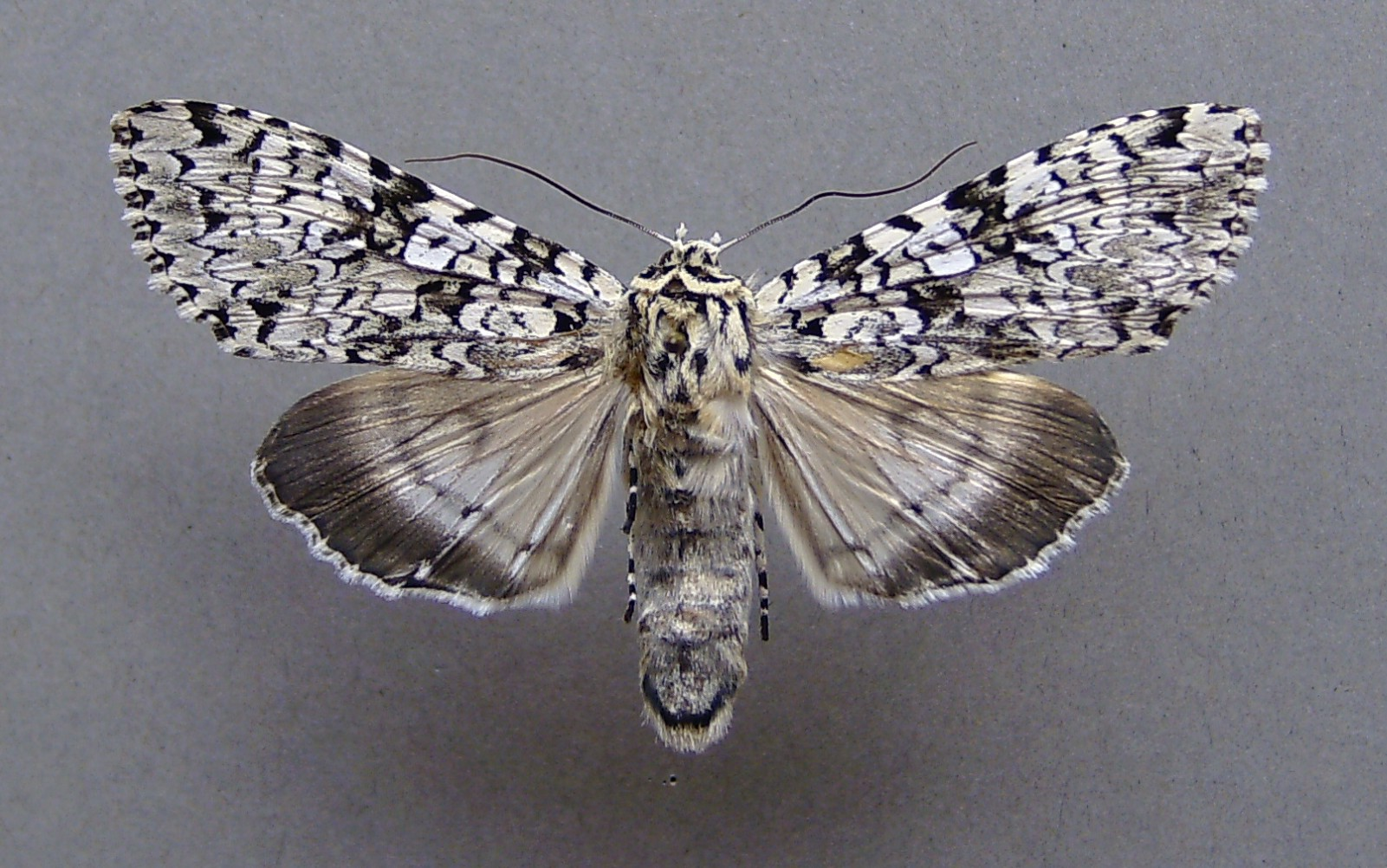

Scientific classification
- Domain: Eukaryota
- Kingdom: Animalia
- Phylum: Arthropoda
- Class: Insecta
- Order: Lepidoptera
- Superfamily: Noctuoidea
- Family: Noctuidae
- Genus: Polia
- Species: P. goliath

Binomial name
- Polia goliath (Oberthür, 1880)

Synonyms
- Dichonia goliath Oberthur, 1880

= Polia goliath =

Species of moth

Polia goliath is a moth of the family Noctuidae first described by Charles Oberthür in 1880. It is found in eastern Asia including Japan and Taiwan.

The wingspan is 50–58 mm.
