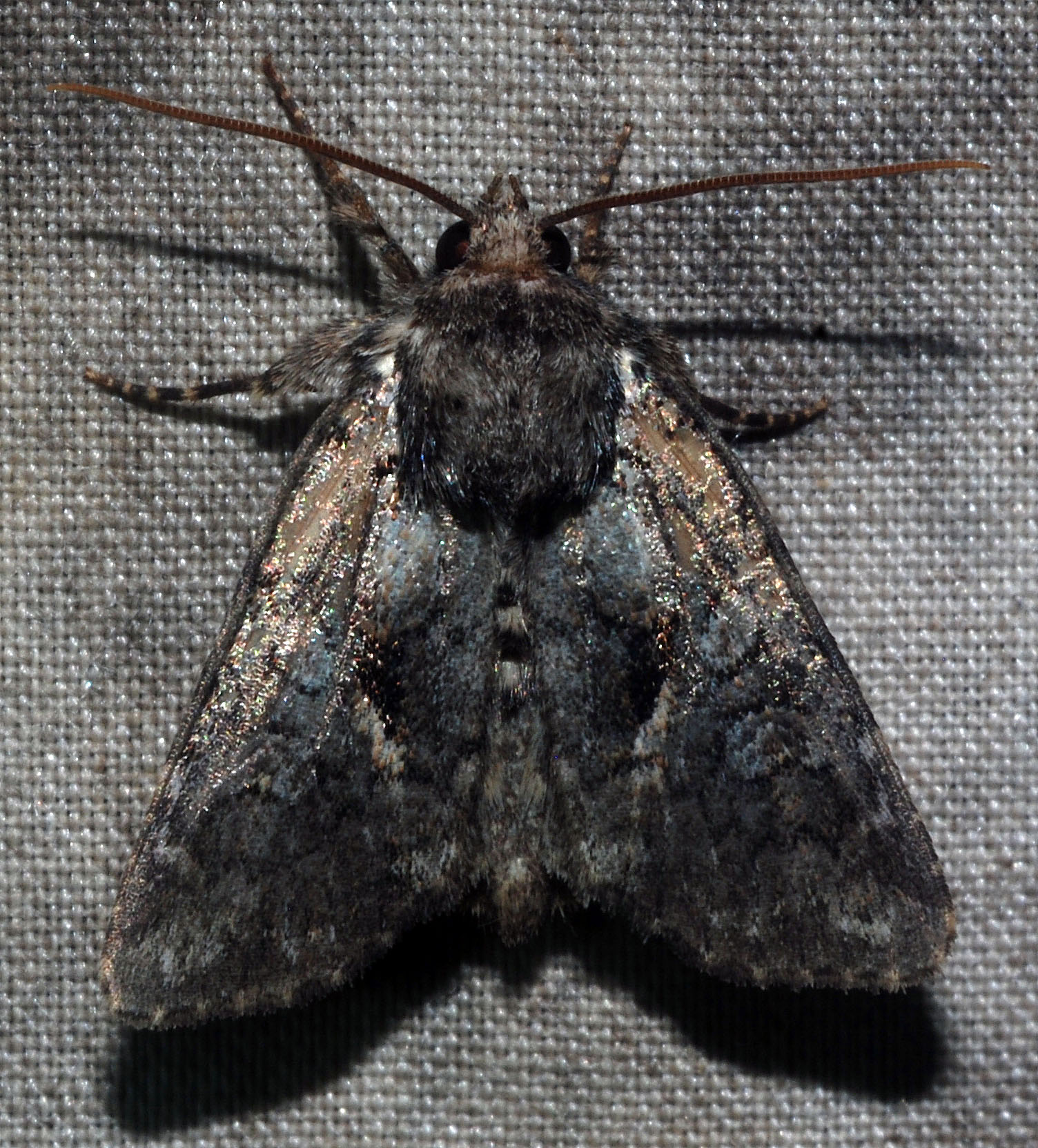

Scientific classification
- Kingdom: Animalia
- Phylum: Arthropoda
- Class: Insecta
- Order: Lepidoptera
- Superfamily: Noctuoidea
- Family: Noctuidae
- Tribe: Eriopygini
- Genus: Orthodes
- Species: O. detracta

Binomial name
- Orthodes detracta (Walker, 1857)

= Orthodes detracta =

Species of moth

Orthodes detracta, the disparaged arches, is a species of cutworm or dart moth in the family Noctuidae. It is found in North America.

The MONA or Hodges number for Orthodes detracta is 10288.
