= Karl Eckstein =

German entomologist (1859–1939)

Karl Eckstein (28 December 1859 in Grünberg, Silesia – 22 April 1939 in Ragusa, Dalmatia) was a German entomologist who specialised in Lepidoptera.

He studied natural sciences at the University of Giessen, receiving his doctorate in 1884 with a thesis on rotatoria. In 1886, he became an assistant to Bernard Altum at the zoological institute of the Eberswalde Forestry Academy in Eberswalde. In 1890 he obtained his habilitation, and in 1900 succeeded Altum as professor of forest zoology at the Academy.

He wrote Die Schmetterlinge Deutschlands mit besonderer Berücksichtigung ihrer Biologie und wirtschaftlichen Bedeutung, which included Die Kleinschmetterlinge Deutschlands (5 volumes, 1913–1933). Other noted works by Eckstein are:

- Pflanzengallen und Gallentiere, 1891 – On plant galls.
- Forstliche zoologie, 1897 – Forest zoology.
- Fischerei und Fischzucht, 1902 – Fishing and fish farming.
