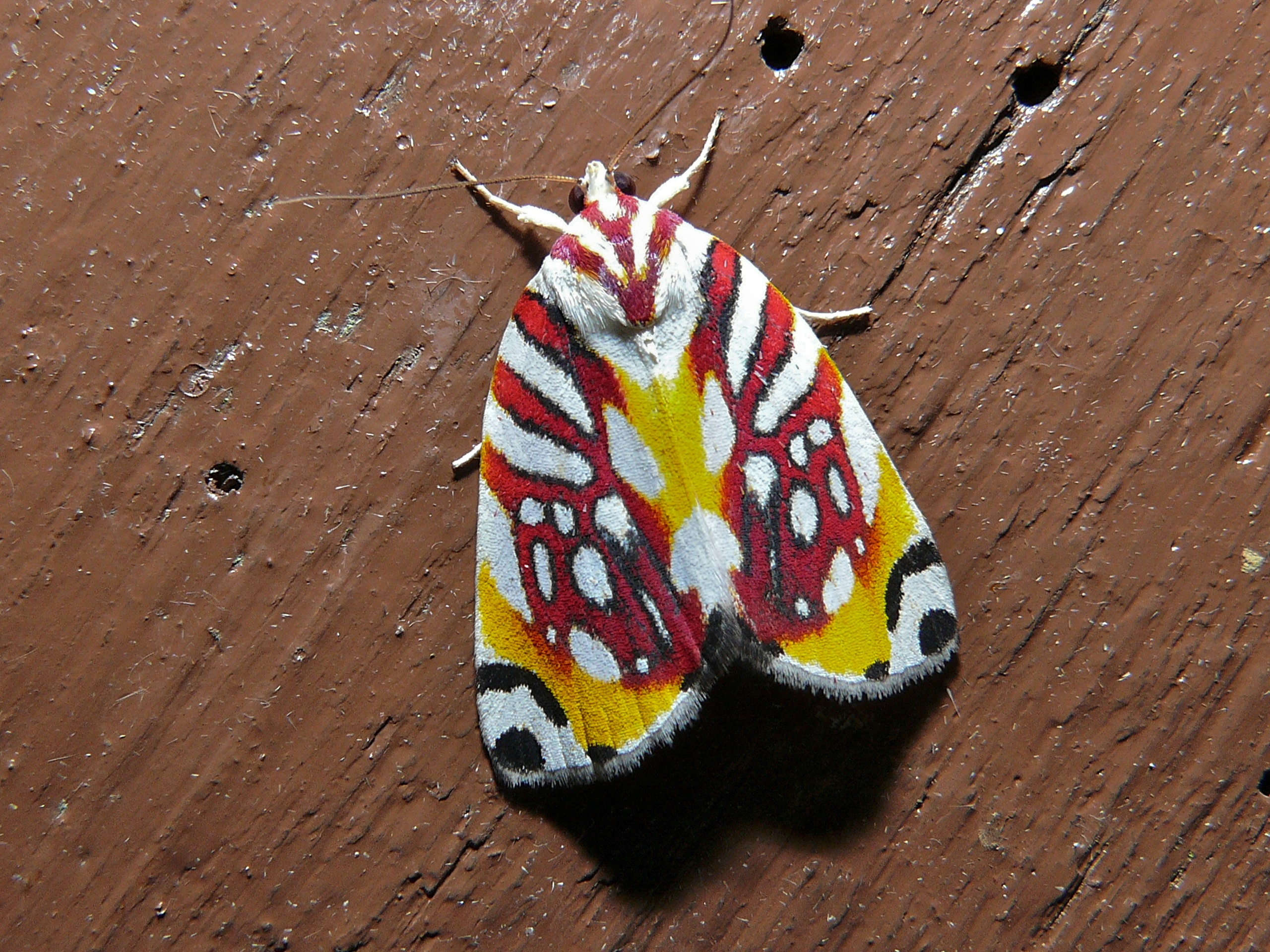
- Sinna calospila

Scientific classification
- Kingdom: Animalia
- Phylum: Arthropoda
- Clade: Pancrustacea
- Class: Insecta
- Order: Lepidoptera
- Superfamily: Noctuoidea
- Family: Nolidae
- Subfamily: Chloephorinae
- Tribe: Ariolicini; Mell, 1943

= Ariolicini =

Tribe of the subfamily Chloephorinae

Ariolicini is a tribe of subfamily Chloephorinae of the moth family Nolidae.

== Genera ==
- Arachnognatha
- Ariola
- Ariolica
- Asinduma
- Chandica
- Detounda
- Gabala
- Labanda
- Lasiolopha
- Maceda
- Paracrama
- Siglophora
- Sinna
- Titulcia
