= Gabala =

Gabala may refer to:

== Places and jurisdictions ==
- Ancient name of Jableh, a Christian city in Syria and Byzantine (arch)bishopric into the Middle Ages, now a Latin Catholic titular see
  - Roman Catholic Diocese of Gabala, now a titular see
- Tabala (Lydia), an ancient settlement and bishopric in Lydia
- Gabala (Angola), a town in Angola
- Qabala District, a region of Azerbaijan
- Qabala, a city of Qabala District, Azerbaijan
  - Gabala FK, a football club in the above town

== Other ==
- Gabala (moth), a genus of nolid moths
- Gabala Radar Station, an early warning radar station run by Russian Space Forces

== See also ==
- Gabalas
