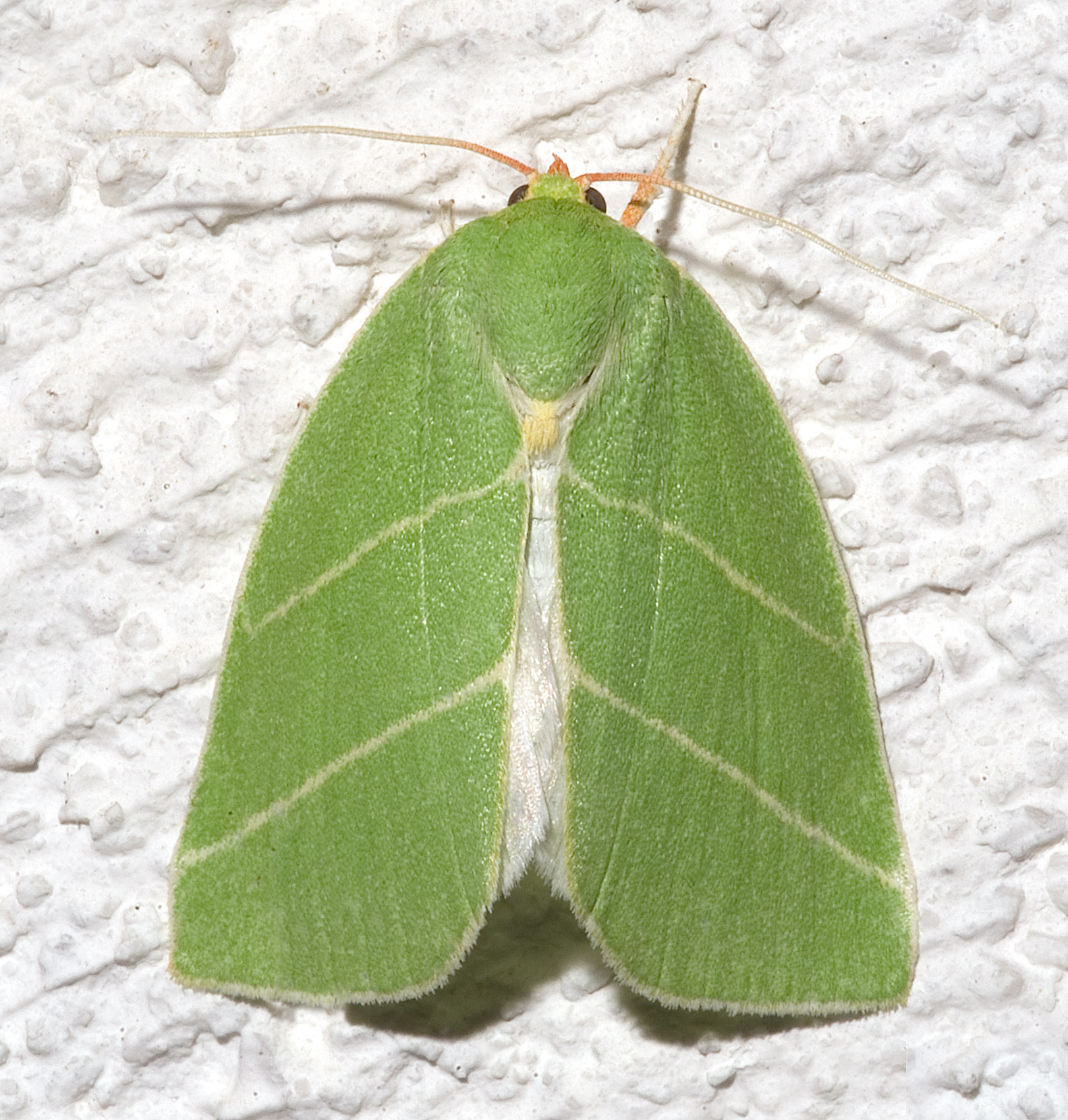
- Scarce silver-lines, Bena bicolorana

Scientific classification
- Kingdom: Animalia
- Phylum: Arthropoda
- Clade: Pancrustacea
- Class: Insecta
- Order: Lepidoptera
- Superfamily: Noctuoidea
- Family: Nolidae
- Subfamily: Chloephorinae; Stainton, 1859

Type genus
- Pseudoips Hübner, 1822

Tribes
- Sarrothripini; Chloephorini; Camptolomini; Careini; Ariolicini

Synonyms
- Chlöephoridae Stainton, 1859

= Chloephorinae =

Subfamily of moths

Chloephorinae is a subfamily of the moth family Nolidae. It includes, among others, many of the moths known as silver-lines. They are rather similar to some owlet moths (Noctuidae) in appearance and often colored a vivid green, but may also be brown, grey, or white.

== Genera incertae sedis ==
In addition to the about 55 genera assigned to tribes, there are some additional ones of undetermined relationships:

- Acachmena Turner, 1908
- Apothriguna Berio, 1962
- Armactica Walker, 1865
- Austrocarea Holloway, 1977
- Autanthema Warren, 1912
- Beara Walker, 1866
- Chlorozada Hampson, 1912
- Clethrophora Hampson, 1894
- Clytophylla Turner, 1929
- Dilophothripoides Strand, 1917
- Erizada Walker, 1865
- Gabala Walker, [1866]
- Gelastocera Butler, 1877
- Hylophilodes Hampson, 1912
- Iscadia Walker, 1857
- Labanda Walker, 1859
- Lasiolopha Turner, 1920
- Lobocraspis Hampson, 1895
- Lophocrama Hampson, 1912
- Lophothripa Hampson, 1896
- Maceda Walker, 1857
- Macrobarasa Hampson, 1912
- Macrochthonia Butler, 1881
- Maurilia Möschler, 1884
- Metaleptina Holland, 1893
- Microthripa Hampson, 1912
- Microzada Hampson, 1912
- Negeta Walker, 1862
- Neonegeta Hampson, 1912
- Paraxestis Hampson, 1902
- Plagerepne Tams, 1926
- Plectothripa Hampson, 1918
- Plusiocalpe Holland, 1894
- Pterogonia C. Swinhoe, 1891
- Ptisciana Walker, 1865
- Thriponea Hulstaert, 1924
- Titulcia Walker, 1864
- Tornoconia Berio, 1966
- Tortriciforma Hampson, 1894
- Tyana Walker, 1866
- Tympanistes Moore, 1867
- Urbona Walker, 1862
- Vizaga C. Swinhoe, 1901
- Xanthodes Guenée, 1852
- Xenochroa Felder, 1874

ForPardoxia Vives Moreno & González Prada, 1981 see Noctuidae, Bagisarinae per Afromoths and sources within.
