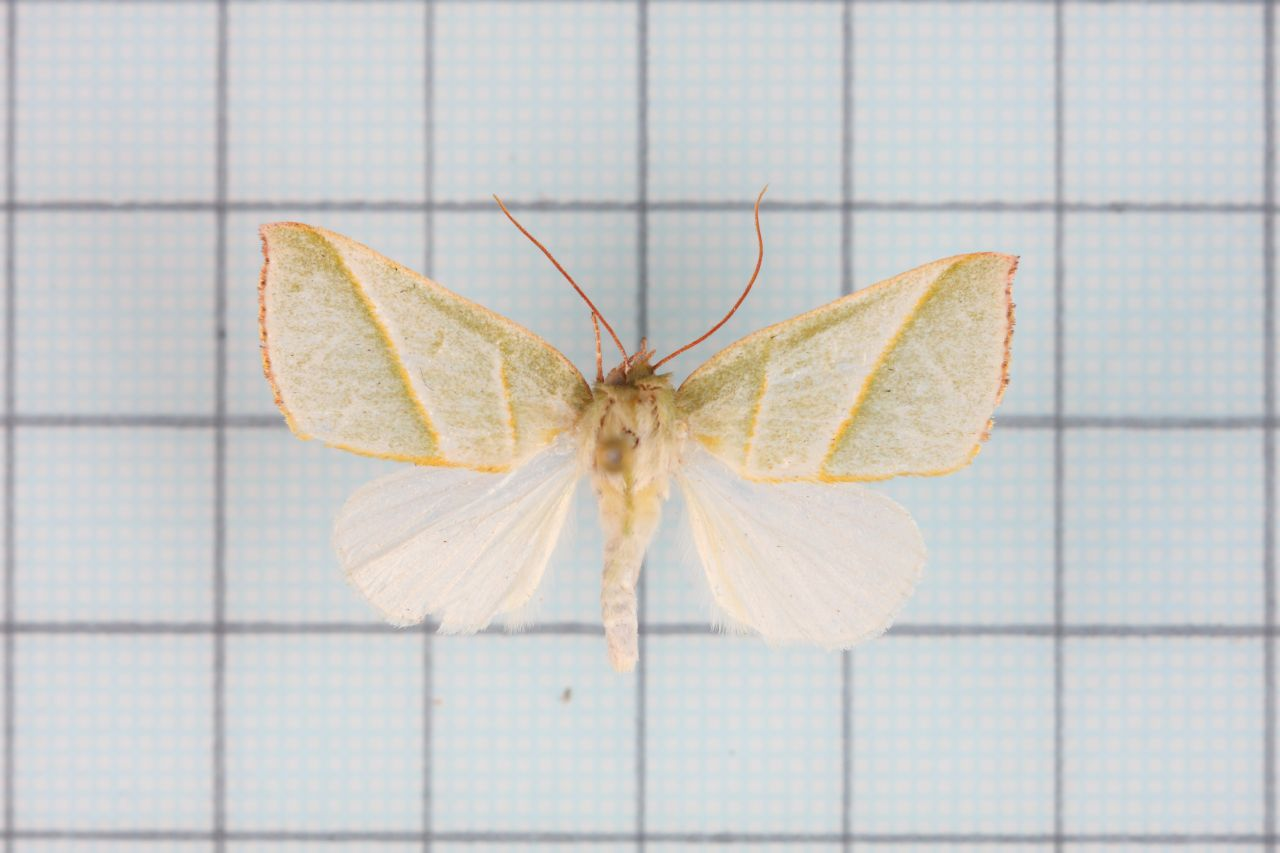
- Hylophilodes tsukusensis

Scientific classification
- Kingdom: Animalia
- Phylum: Arthropoda
- Class: Insecta
- Order: Lepidoptera
- Superfamily: Noctuoidea
- Family: Nolidae
- Subfamily: Chloephorinae
- Genus: Hylophilodes; Hampson, 1912

= Hylophilodes =

Genus of moths

Hylophilodes is a genus of moths of the family Nolidae.

== Species ==
- Hylophilodes buddhae (Alpheraky, 1897)
- Hylophilodes burmana Berio, 1973
- Hylophilodes dubia Prout, 1926
- Hylophilodes elegans Draudt, 1950
- Hylophilodes esakii Fukushima, 1943
- Hylophilodes orientalis (Hampson, 1894)
- Hylophilodes pseudorientalis Prout, 1921
- Hylophilodes rara Fukushima, 1943
- Hylophilodes rubromarginata (Bethune-Baker, 1906)
- Hylophilodes tortriciformis Strand, 1917
- Hylophilodes tsukusensis Nagano, 1918
