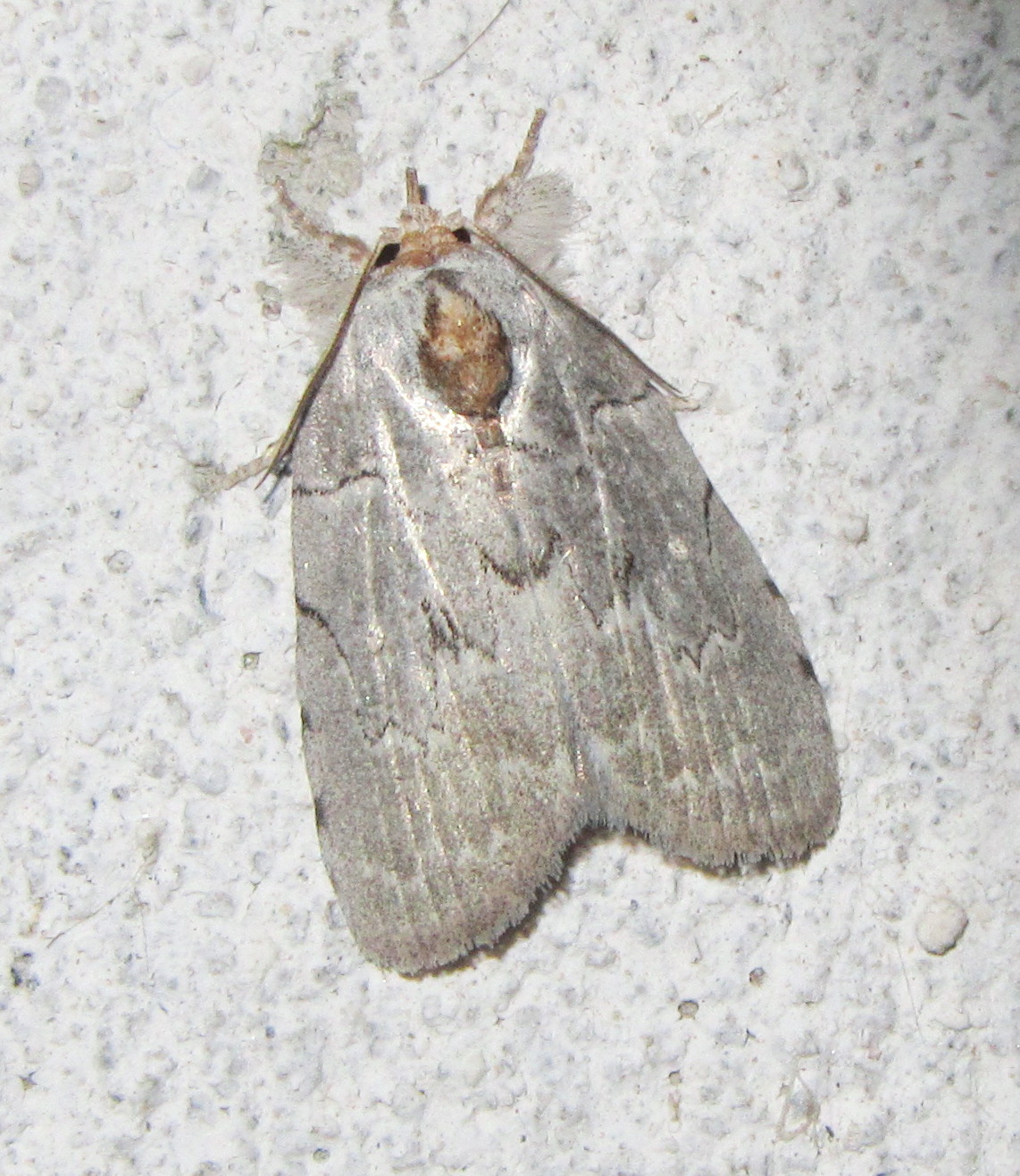

Scientific classification
- Kingdom: Animalia
- Phylum: Arthropoda
- Clade: Pancrustacea
- Class: Insecta
- Order: Lepidoptera
- Superfamily: Noctuoidea
- Family: Nolidae
- Subfamily: Chloephorinae
- Genus: Ptisciana; Walker, 1865
- Species: P. seminivea

Binomial name
- Ptisciana seminivea (Moore, 1888)

Synonyms
- Symitha lilacina Moore, 1888

= Ptisciana =

Genus of moths

Ptisciana seminivea is a moth of the family Nolidae first described by Frederic Moore in 1888. It is the only species in the genus Ptisciana. It is found in Oriental tropics of India, Sri Lanka, to Sundaland, the Philippines and Sulawesi.

== Description ==
Forewings silvery gray with irregular pale fasciation. Darker flecks found only on costa. The caterpillar is glossy, and light grass green. On each segment, there is faint yellow spot on anterior spiracles. Dorso-lateral tubercles are pale yellow. Pupation occurs in an oval tapered cocoon. Pupa dorso-ventrally flattened and semi-ovoid.

Larval host plant is Macaranga.
