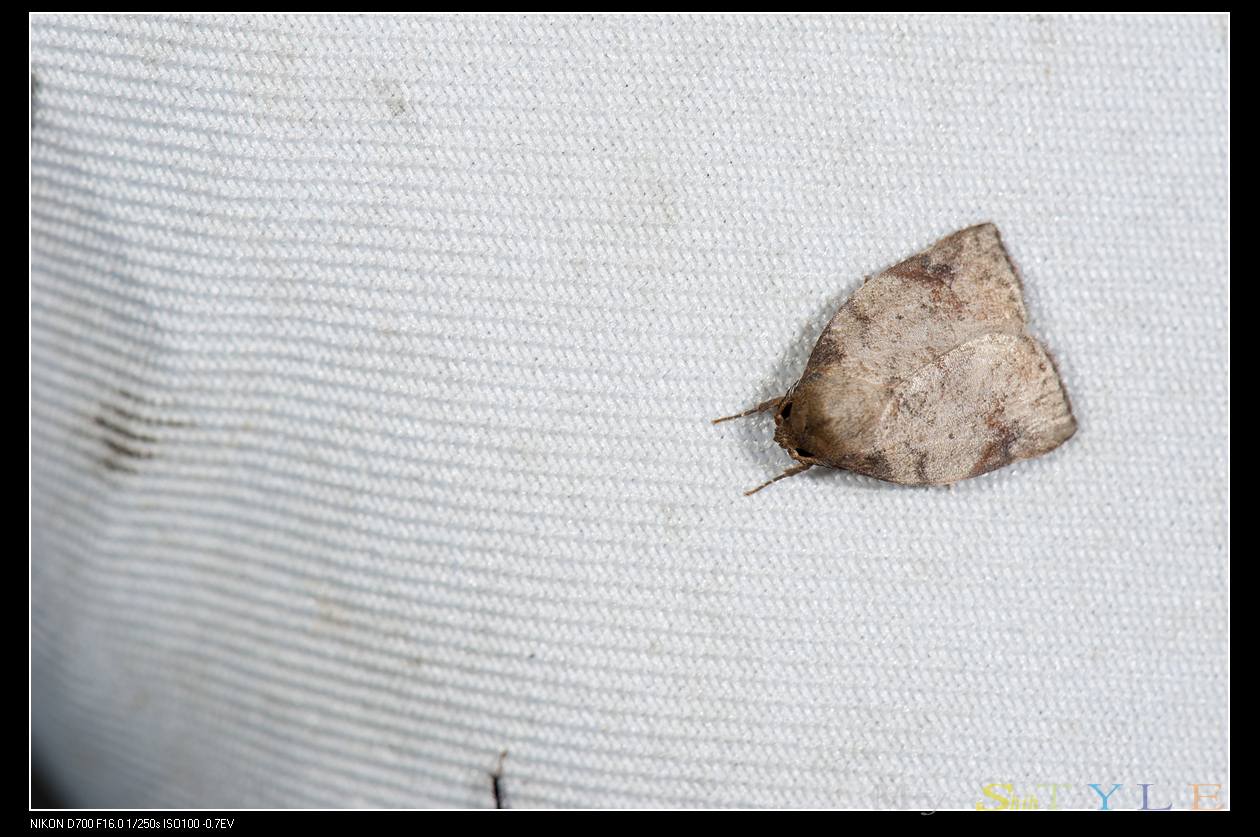
- Beara tortriciformis

Scientific classification
- Kingdom: Animalia
- Phylum: Arthropoda
- Class: Insecta
- Order: Lepidoptera
- Superfamily: Noctuoidea
- Family: Nolidae
- Subfamily: Chloephorinae
- Genus: Beara; Walker, 1866

= Beara (moth) =

Genus of moths

Beara is a genus of moths of the family Nolidae. The genus was erected by Francis Walker in 1866.

== Description ==
Palpi upturned, reaching above vertex of head, and third joint rather long. Antennae minutely ciliated (haired) in male. Forewings with arched costa, acute apex and excurved outer margin. Vein 8 anastomosing (fusing) with vein 9 and 10 to form very minute areole. Hindwings with stalked veins 3 and 4.

== Species ==
- Beara achromatica Hampson, 1918
- Beara cornuta Holloway, 1982
- Beara dichromella Walker, 1866
- Beara falcata Holloway, 1982
- Beara nubiferella Walker, 1866
- Beara simplex Warren, 1912
- Beara tortriciformis (Strand, 1917)
