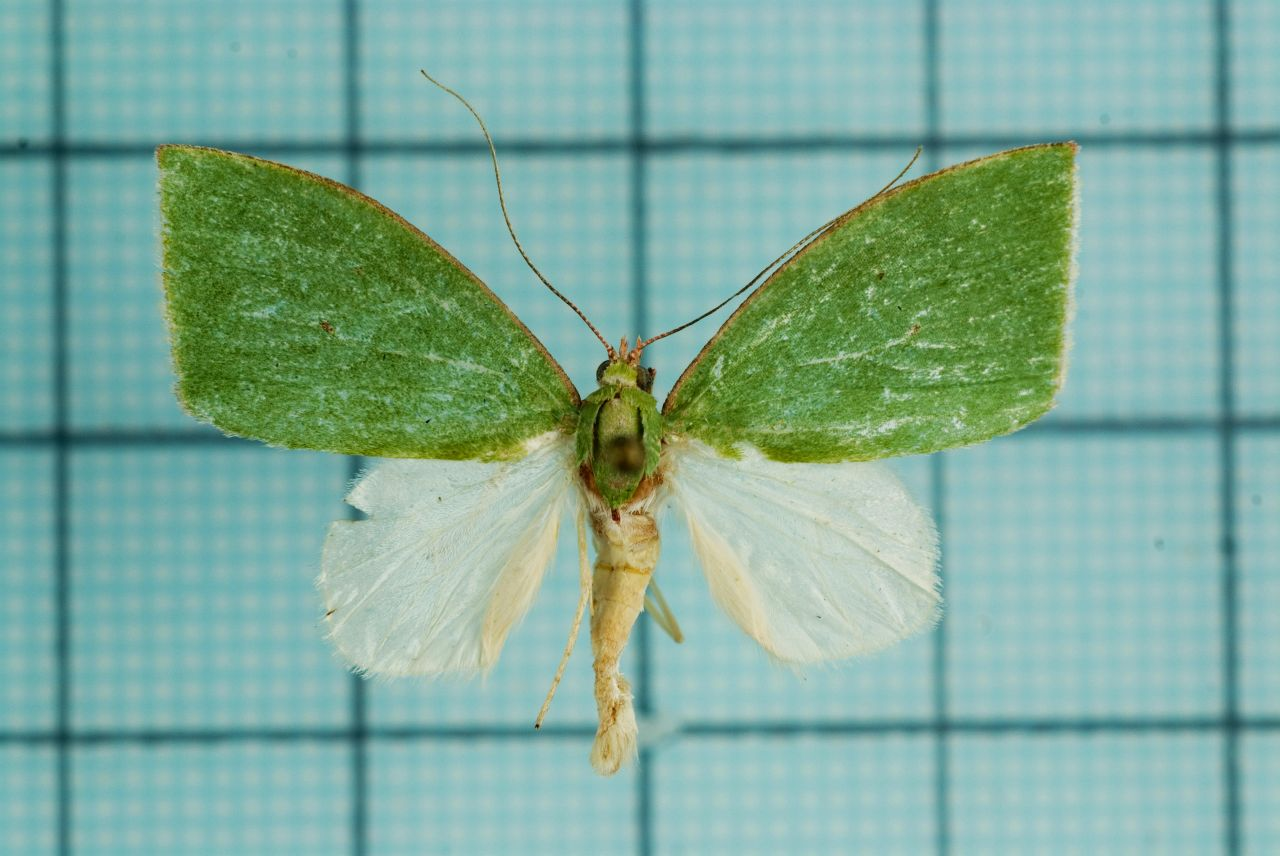
- Tyana falcata

Scientific classification
- Kingdom: Animalia
- Phylum: Arthropoda
- Class: Insecta
- Order: Lepidoptera
- Superfamily: Noctuoidea
- Family: Nolidae
- Subfamily: Chloephorinae
- Genus: Tyana; Walker, 1866

= Tyana (moth) =

Genus of moths

Tyana is a genus of moths of the family Nolidae. The genus was erected by Francis Walker in 1866.

== Species ==
- Tyana callichlora Walker, 1866
- Tyana carneicilia Prout, 1928
- Tyana chloroleuca Walker, 1866
- Tyana elongata Warren, 1916
- Tyana falcata (Walker, 1866)
- Tyana flavitegulae Rothschild, 1920
- Tyana fuscitorna Draudt, 1950
- Tyana hoenei Draudt, 1950
- Tyana magniplaga Warren, 1916
- Tyana marina Warren, 1916
- Tyana monosticta Hampson, 1912
- Tyana ornata Wileman, 1910
- Tyana pustulifera (Walker, 1866)
- Tyana tenuimargo Druce, 1911
