= Pterogonia aurigutta =

Scientific classification
- Kingdom: Animalia
- Phylum: Arthropoda
- Class: Insecta
- Order: Lepidoptera
- Superfamily: Noctuoidea
- Family: Erebidae
- Genus: Pterogonia
- Species: P. aurigutta

Binomial name
- Pterogonia aurigutta (Walker, 1858)

Synonyms
- Thalatta aurigutta Walker, 1858; Doranaga striatura Moore, 1887; Pterognia [sic] irrorata Dudgeon, 1905; Pterogonia aurigutta Walker; Kobes, 1997

Species of moth

Pterogonia aurigutta is a moth of the family Nolidae first described by Francis Walker in 1858. It is found in Sundaland, Singapore, Thailand, the Andaman Islands and Sri Lanka.

== Description ==
It has pale reddish-brown forewings. An angled, dark postmedial fascia is visible. A pale discal spot is found in females.
