= Metaleptina =

Scientific classification
- Kingdom: Animalia
- Phylum: Arthropoda
- Class: Insecta
- Order: Lepidoptera
- Superfamily: Noctuoidea
- Family: Nolidae
- Subfamily: Chloephorinae
- Genus: Metaleptina; Holland, 1893

Genus of moths

Metaleptina is a genus of moths of the family Nolidae. The genus was erected by William Jacob Holland in 1893.

== Species ==
- Metaleptina albibasis Holland, 1893
- Metaleptina albicosta Berio, 1964
- Metaleptina albilinea Hampson, 1912
- Metaleptina andriavolo Viette, 1976
- Metaleptina coronata Berio, 1964
- Metaleptina digramma (Hampson, 1905)
- Metaleptina dileuca Hampson, 1912
- Metaleptina geminastra (Hampson, 1905)
- Metaleptina microcyma (Hampson, 1905)
- Metaleptina nigribasis Holland, 1893
- Metaleptina obliterata Holland, 1893
- Metaleptina sarice (Viette, 1981)
- Metaleptina serrulinea Bryk, 1913
- Metaleptina simplex Berio, 1964
- Metaleptina subnigra Berio, 1964
