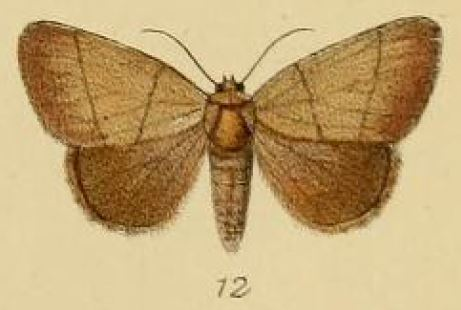

Scientific classification
- Kingdom: Animalia
- Phylum: Arthropoda
- Class: Insecta
- Order: Lepidoptera
- Superfamily: Noctuoidea
- Family: Nolidae
- Genus: Neonegeta
- Species: N. pollusca

Binomial name
- Neonegeta pollusca (Schaus, 1893)

Synonyms
- Leocyma pollusca Schaus & Clements, 1893

= Neonegeta pollusca =

Species of moth

Neonegeta pollusca is a moth of the family Nolidae, first described by William Schaus in 1893. It is found in Sierra Leone and Ghana.
