= Beara dichromella =

Scientific classification
- Kingdom: Animalia
- Phylum: Arthropoda
- Class: Insecta
- Order: Lepidoptera
- Superfamily: Noctuoidea
- Family: Nolidae
- Genus: Beara
- Species: B. dichromella

Binomial name
- Beara dichromella Walker, 1866

Species of moth

Beara dichromella is a moth of the family Nolidae first described by Francis Walker in 1866. It is found in Sri Lanka, and India.

== Description ==
Forewings pinkish-grey brown. Costa sinuous and apex falcate. The caterpillar has a chocolate coloured body with short black hairlets and whitish primary setae. Anal segment is brownish orange. Thoracic segments greyish in dorsum with a quadrate orange mark. Pupa semi-ovoid without cremaster. Cocoon is woven using brown, black-speckled silk. Larval host plants are Grewia, Trema, Ziziphus, Hibiscus, Celtis and Xylia.
