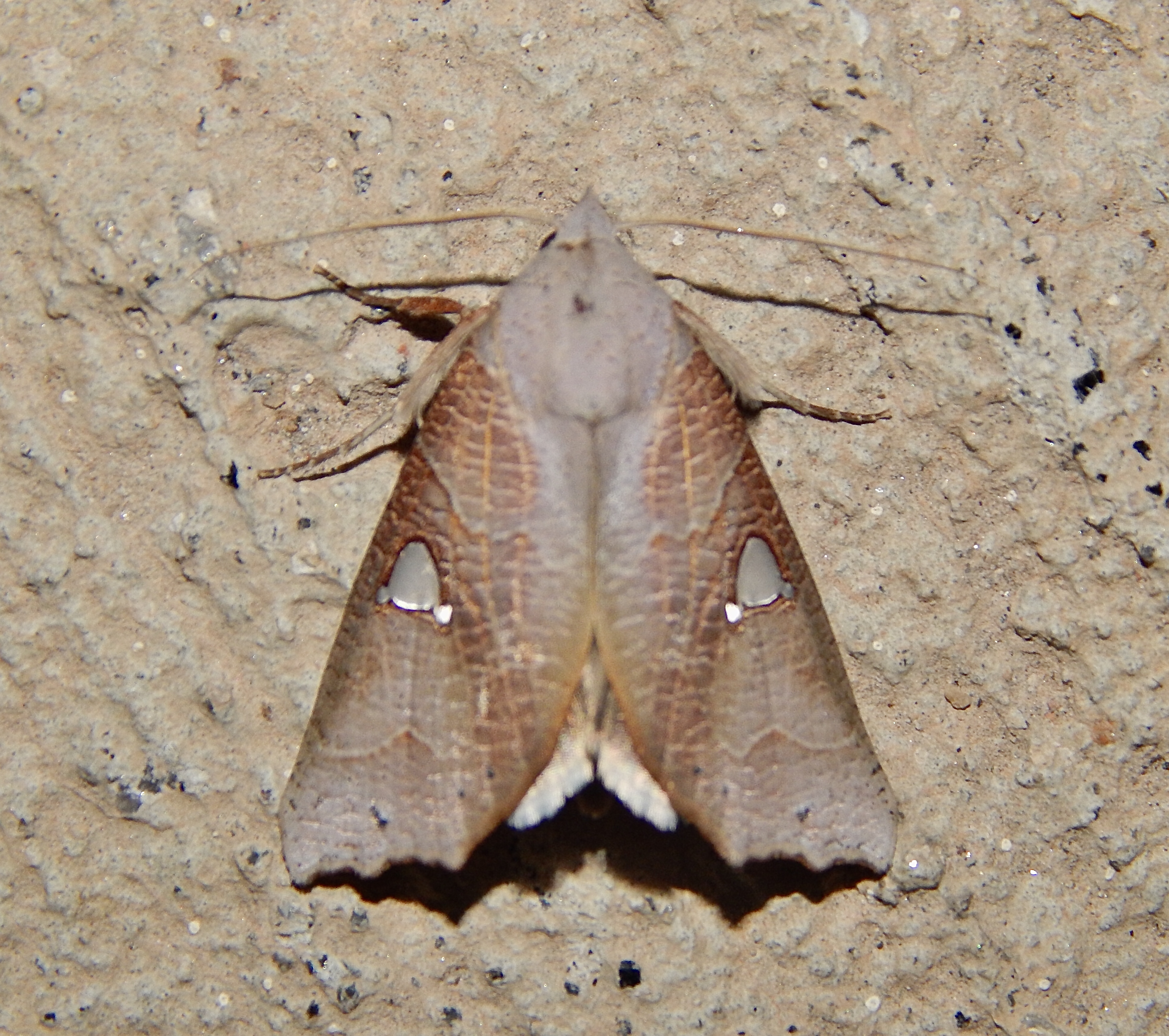
- In the Western Ghats of India

Scientific classification
- Domain: Eukaryota
- Kingdom: Animalia
- Phylum: Arthropoda
- Class: Insecta
- Order: Lepidoptera
- Superfamily: Noctuoidea
- Family: Erebidae
- Genus: Pterogonia
- Species: P. episcopalis

Binomial name
- Pterogonia episcopalis (C. Swinhoe, 1891)

= Pterogonia episcopalis =

Species of moth

Pterogonia episcopalis is a species of moth in the family Nolidae that was first described by Charles Swinhoe in 1891. It is found on the Indian subcontinent.

== Description ==
Pterogonia episcopalis's head and thorax are violaceous grey with a few brown scales. Its abdomen is pale brown with slight whitish segmental hues. The claspers are fringed with rufous hair. The ventral surface is whitish except towards the extremity of the species.
