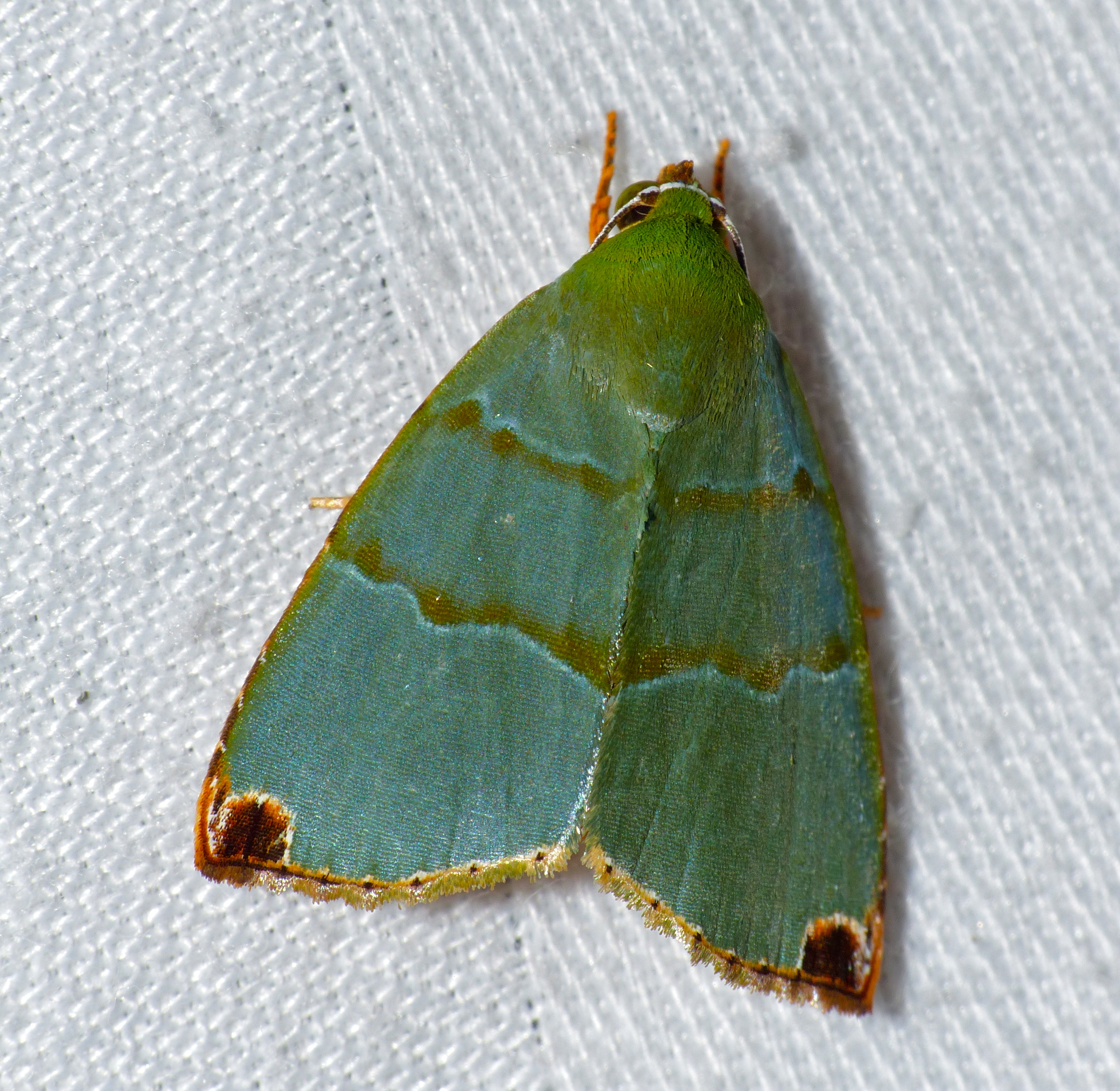

Scientific classification
- Kingdom: Animalia
- Phylum: Arthropoda
- Class: Insecta
- Order: Lepidoptera
- Superfamily: Noctuoidea
- Family: Nolidae
- Genus: Paracrama
- Species: P. dulcissima

Binomial name
- Paracrama dulcissima (Walker, 1864)

Synonyms
- Nolasena dulcissima Walker, [1863] 1864; Paracrama rectomarginata Hampson, 1891; Paracrama dulcissima ab. aurea Strand, 1917; Paracrama dulcissima ab. flammans Strand, 1917; Paracrama dulcissima aurea Gaede and flammans Gaede, 1937; Paracrama dulcissima Walker; Kobes, 1997

= Paracrama dulcissima =

Species of moth

Paracrama dulcissima is a moth of the family Nolidae first described by Francis Walker in 1864. It is found in Indo-Australian tropics of India, Sri Lanka and the Bismarck Islands.

== Description ==
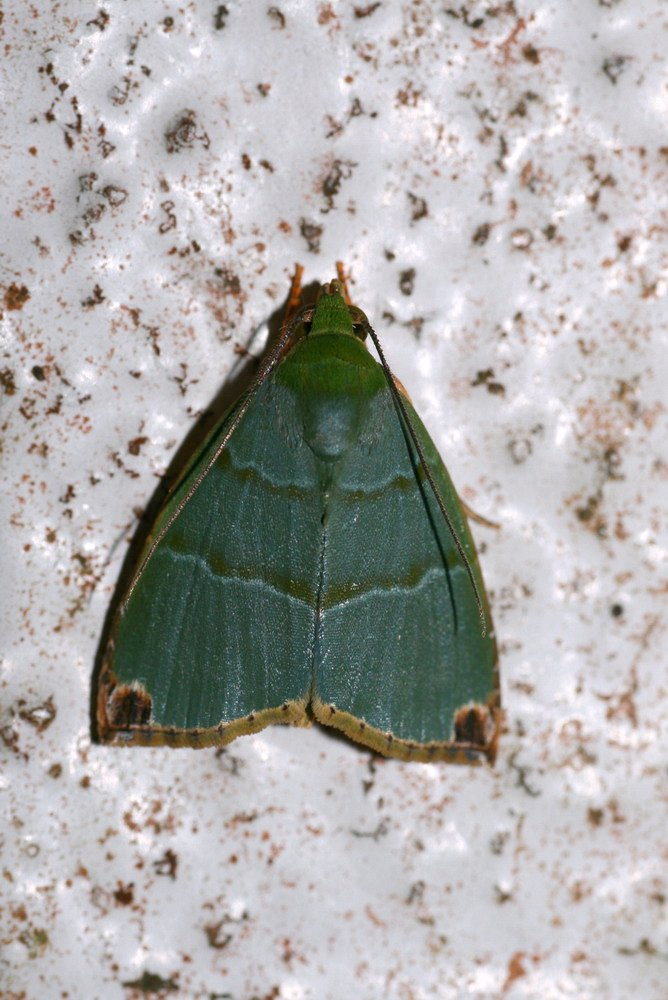

Forewings greenish bordered with red and gray. Hindwings of the male are deeper orange red while the female has much paler orange-red hindwings. Caterpillar claviform (club shaped). Body yellowish white with brown marbles. Only primary setae present. There are two small conical protuberances found on a transverse ridge. Ventrum is leaden white. Pupation occurs in a dark brown shiny cocoon. Pupa ovoid with cremaster hooks. Cocoon truncated and semi-ovoid.

Larval host plant is Grewia species.
