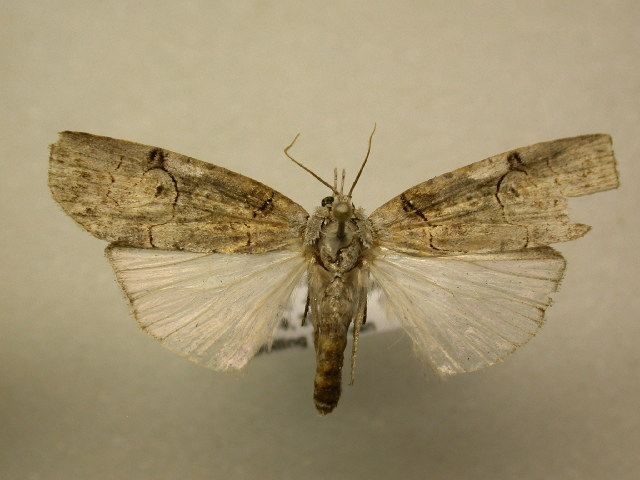

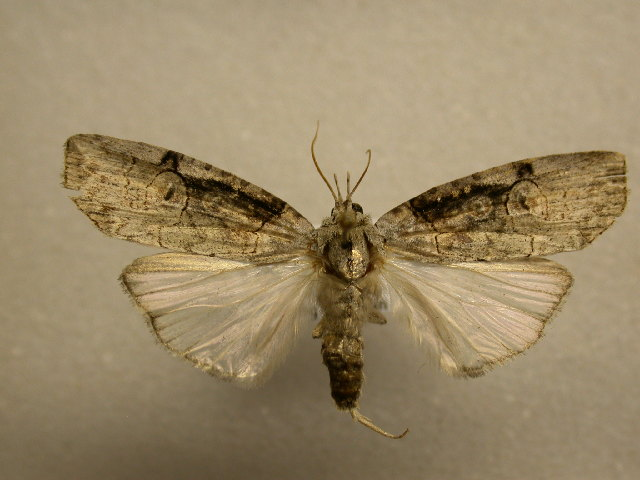

Scientific classification
- Kingdom: Animalia
- Phylum: Arthropoda
- Class: Insecta
- Order: Lepidoptera
- Superfamily: Noctuoidea
- Family: Nolidae
- Genus: Iscadia
- Species: I. aperta

Binomial name
- Iscadia aperta Walker, 1857

Synonyms
- Encalypta schildei Möschler, 1890

= Iscadia aperta =

Species of moth

Iscadia aperta is a moth of the family Nolidae. It is found in Arizona and Texas, Central America, South America and the Antilles.
