= Labanda fasciata =

Scientific classification
- Kingdom: Animalia
- Phylum: Arthropoda
- Class: Insecta
- Order: Lepidoptera
- Superfamily: Noctuoidea
- Family: Nolidae
- Genus: Labanda
- Species: L. fasciata

Binomial name
- Labanda fasciata (Walker, 1865)

Synonyms
- Lazanda fasciata Walker, 1865; Diomea muscosa Walker, 1865

Species of moth

Labanda fasciata is a moth in the family Nolidae first described by Francis Walker in 1865. It is found in Sri Lanka.
