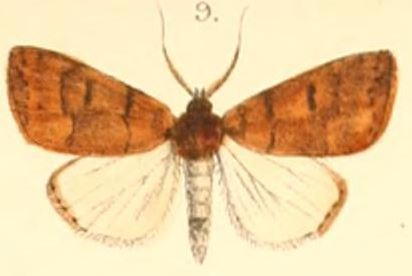

Scientific classification
- Domain: Eukaryota
- Kingdom: Animalia
- Phylum: Arthropoda
- Class: Insecta
- Order: Lepidoptera
- Superfamily: Noctuoidea
- Family: Nolidae
- Genus: Gelastocera
- Species: G. castanea

Binomial name
- Gelastocera castanea (Moore, 1879)

Synonyms
- Beara castanea Moore, 1879

= Gelastocera castanea =

Species of moth

Gelastocera castanea is a moth of the family Nolidae, first described by Frederic Moore in 1879. It is found in India, Brunei and Sundaland.
