= Macrobarasa =

Scientific classification
- Kingdom: Animalia
- Phylum: Arthropoda
- Class: Insecta
- Order: Lepidoptera
- Superfamily: Noctuoidea
- Family: Nolidae
- Subfamily: Chloephorinae
- Genus: Macrobarasa; Hampson, 1912

Genus of moths

Macrobarasa is a genus of moths of the family Nolidae. The genus was erected by George Hampson in 1912.

== Species ==
- Macrobarasa xantholopha (Hampson, 1896)
- Macrobarasa xanthosticta (Hampson, 1894)
