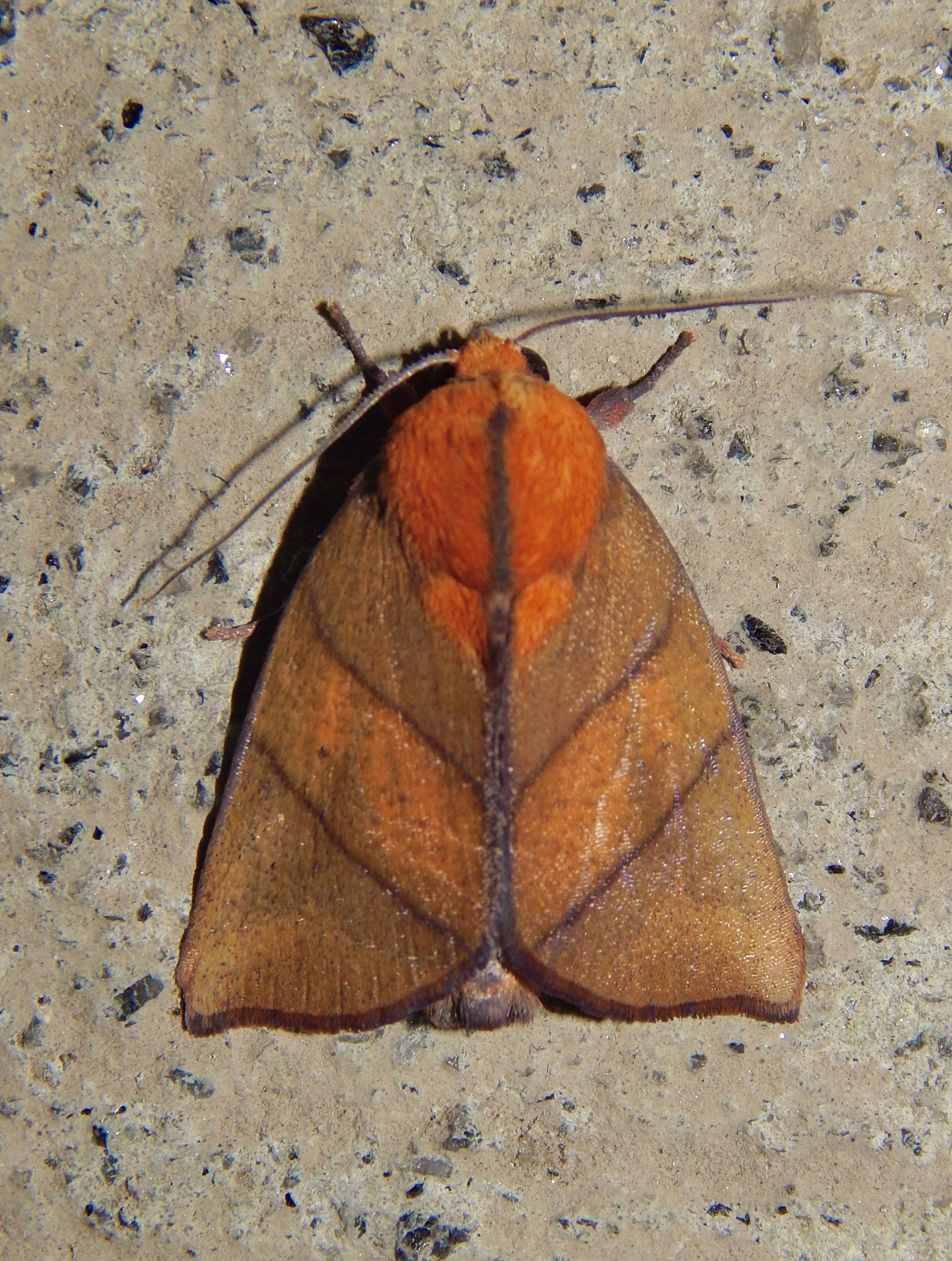

Scientific classification
- Kingdom: Animalia
- Phylum: Arthropoda
- Class: Insecta
- Order: Lepidoptera
- Superfamily: Noctuoidea
- Family: Nolidae
- Genus: Xenochroa
- Species: X. biviata

Binomial name
- Xenochroa biviata (Hampson, 1905)

Synonyms
- Carea biviata

= Xenochroa biviata =

Species of moth

Xenochroa biviata is a moth of the family Nolidae first described by George Hampson in 1905. It is found in India, Peninsular Malaysia, Sumatra and Borneo.
