= Lophothripa =

Scientific classification
- Kingdom: Animalia
- Phylum: Arthropoda
- Clade: Pancrustacea
- Class: Insecta
- Order: Lepidoptera
- Superfamily: Noctuoidea
- Family: Nolidae
- Subfamily: Chloephorinae
- Genus: Lophothripa; Hampson, 1896
- Species: L. vitea

Binomial name
- Lophothripa vitea (Swinhoe, 1885)

Synonyms
- Selepa vitea Swinhoe, 1885; Heteronota ochthias Meyrick, 1902; Lophothripa vitea ab. viteana Strand, 1917; Lophothripa vitea viteana Gaede, 1937

Genus of moths

Lophothripa vitea is a moth of the family Nolidae first described by Swinhoe in 1885. It is the only species in the genus Lophothripa. It is found in Indo-Australian tropics towards the Solomon Islands.

== Description ==
Basal half of forewings blackish with grayish patches in other areas. There are ridges of raised scales. Postmedial line is double and blackish. Caterpillar grass green and cylindrical and smooth having only primary setae. Head bright green and round. Pupation occurs in a semiovoid cocoon made on the underside of the leaf. Pupa slender and spindle shaped without a cremaster.

Larval host plants are Terminalia, Lagerstroemia, Sonneratia and Heritiera species.
