= Labanda semipars =

Scientific classification
- Kingdom: Animalia
- Phylum: Arthropoda
- Class: Insecta
- Order: Lepidoptera
- Superfamily: Noctuoidea
- Family: Nolidae
- Genus: Labanda
- Species: L. semipars

Binomial name
- Labanda semipars (Walker, 1858)

Synonyms
- Bryophila semipars Walker, 1858; Bocana pamphosalis Walker, 1859; Gerbatha laticincta Walker, 1865

Species of moth

Labanda semipars is a moth in the family Nolidae first described by Francis Walker in 1858. It is found in Sri Lanka.

The larval host plants are species of the genus Diospyros.
