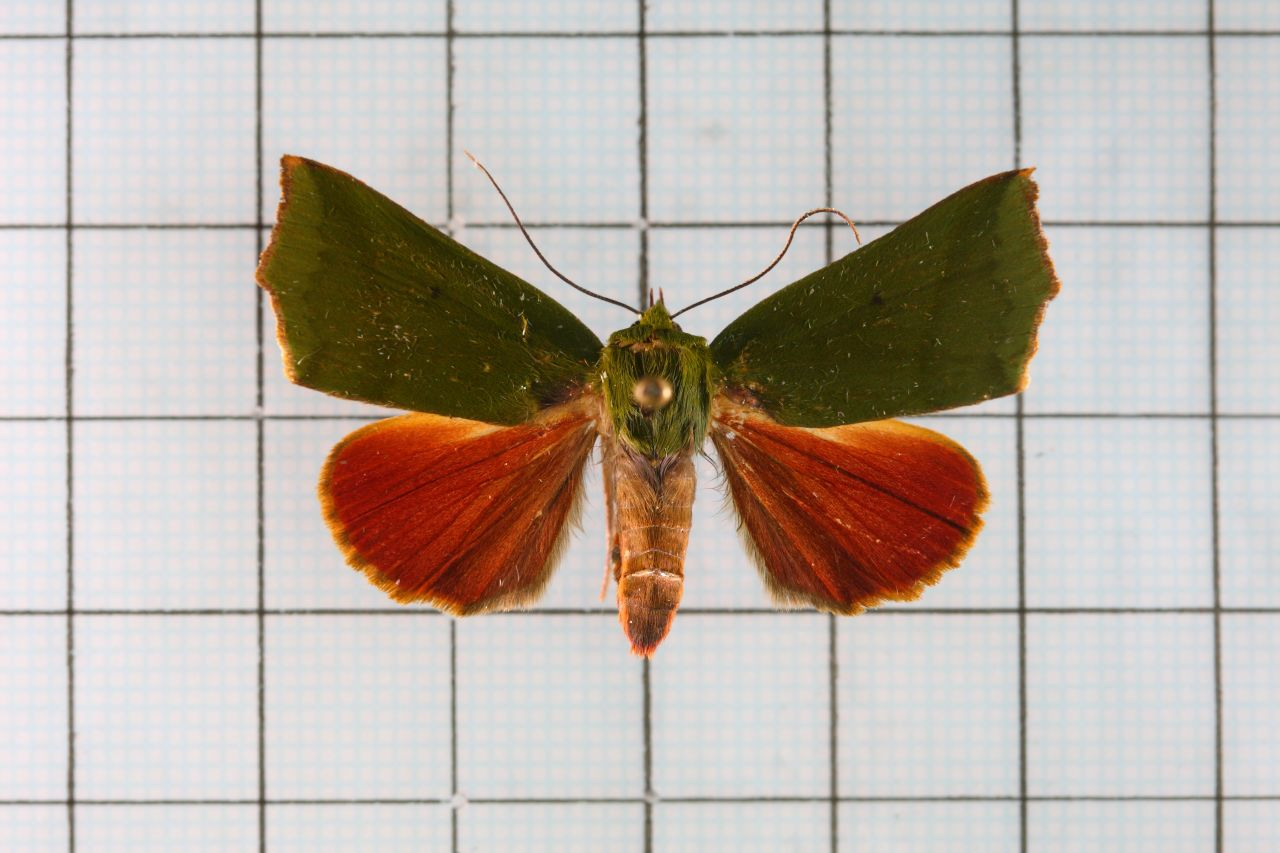

Scientific classification
- Kingdom: Animalia
- Phylum: Arthropoda
- Class: Insecta
- Order: Lepidoptera
- Superfamily: Noctuoidea
- Family: Nolidae
- Genus: Clethrophora
- Species: C. distincta

Binomial name
- Clethrophora distincta (Leech, 1889)

Synonyms
- Gonitis distincta Leech, 1889

= Clethrophora distincta =

Species of moth

Clethrophora distincta is a moth of the family Nolidae first described by John Henry Leech in 1889. It is found in Taiwan, Korea and Japan.

The wingspan is 41–45 mm.

The larvae feed on Quercus species.
