= Erizada rufa =

Scientific classification
- Domain: Eukaryota
- Kingdom: Animalia
- Phylum: Arthropoda
- Class: Insecta
- Order: Lepidoptera
- Superfamily: Noctuoidea
- Family: Nolidae
- Genus: Erizada
- Species: E. rufa

Binomial name
- Erizada rufa Hampson, 1905

Species of insect

Erizada rufa is a moth species described by George Hampson in 1905. Erizada rufa is included in the genus Erizada and the family Nolidae. No subspecies are listed in the Catalogue of Life.
