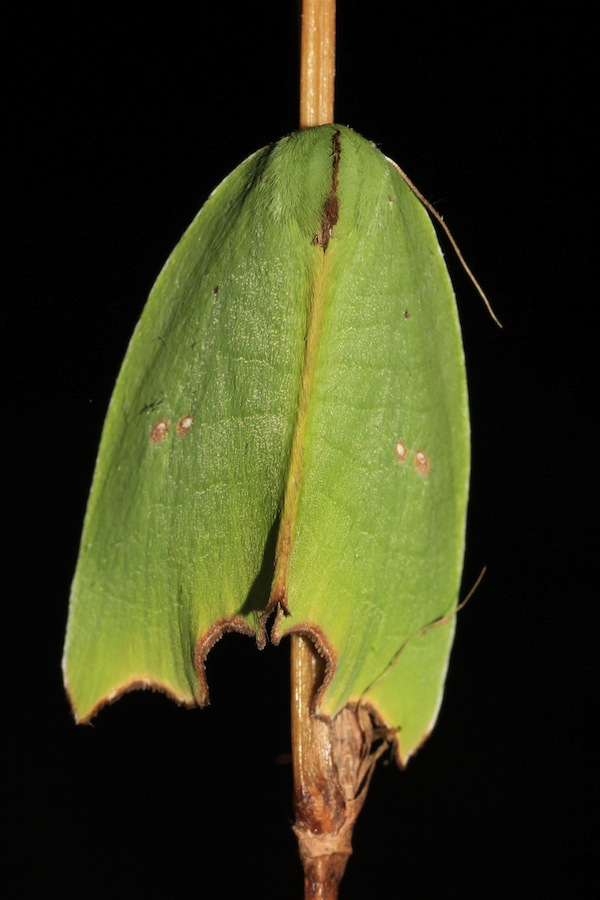
- Plagerepne torquata, Borneo

Scientific classification
- Kingdom: Animalia
- Phylum: Arthropoda
- Class: Insecta
- Order: Lepidoptera
- Superfamily: Noctuoidea
- Family: Nolidae
- Subfamily: Chloephorinae
- Genus: Plagerepne; Tams, 1926
- Species: P. torquata

Binomial name
- Plagerepne torquata Tams, 1926

= Plagerepne =

Genus of moths

Plagerepne is a monotypic genus of moths in the family Nolidae. It has been listed as a genus in the families Noctuidae and Pyralidae by other authors.

Its one species, Plagerepne torquata, can be found in Sundaland, Borneo and Myanmar.
