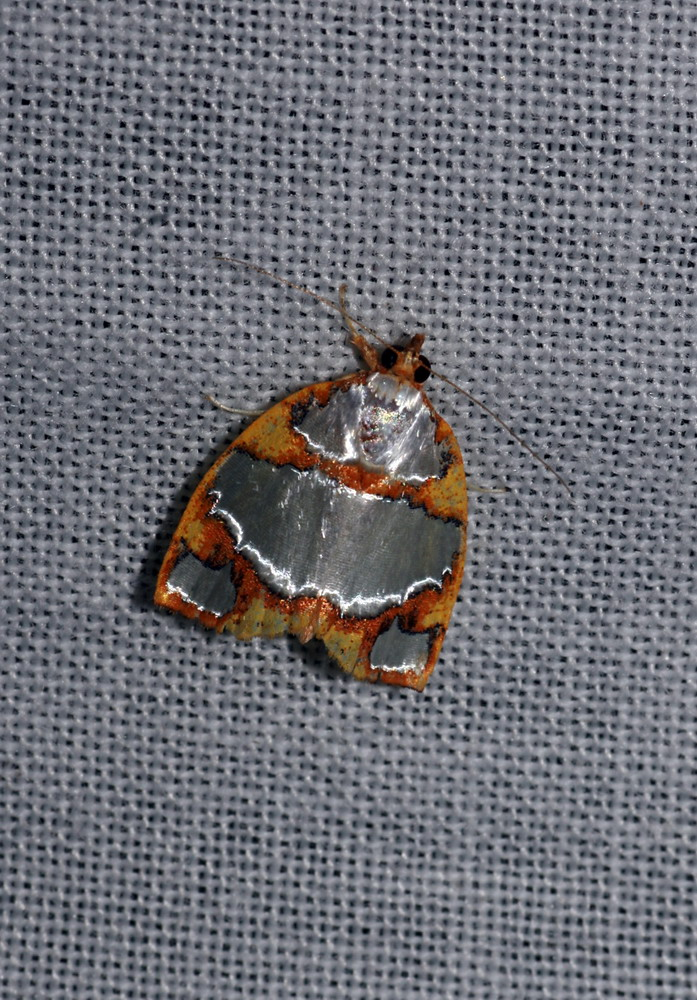

Scientific classification
- Kingdom: Animalia
- Phylum: Arthropoda
- Class: Insecta
- Order: Lepidoptera
- Superfamily: Noctuoidea
- Family: Nolidae
- Genus: Titulcia
- Species: T. eximia

Binomial name
- Titulcia eximia Walker, 1864

= Titulcia eximia =

Species of moth

Titulcia eximia is a moth of the family Nolidae first described by Francis Walker in 1864. It is found in Borneo, Myanmar (Mergui Archipelago), Peninsular Malaysia and Sumatra.
