= Tortriciforma =

Scientific classification
- Kingdom: Animalia
- Phylum: Arthropoda
- Class: Insecta
- Order: Lepidoptera
- Superfamily: Noctuoidea
- Family: Nolidae
- Subfamily: Chloephorinae
- Genus: Tortriciforma; Hampson, 1894

Genus of moths

Tortriciforma is a genus of moths of the family Nolidae. The genus was erected by George Hampson in 1894.

== Species ==
- Tortriciforma chloroplaga Hampson, 1905
- Tortriciforma perviridis Prout, 1928
- Tortriciforma tamsi Holloway, 1976
- Tortriciforma viridipuncta Hampson, 1894
- Tortriciforma viridissima Roepke, 1948
