= Erizada =

Scientific classification
- Kingdom: Animalia
- Phylum: Arthropoda
- Class: Insecta
- Order: Lepidoptera
- Superfamily: Noctuoidea
- Family: Nolidae
- Subfamily: Chloephorinae
- Genus: Erizada; Walker, 1865

Synonyms
- Rhizana Walker,1865; Tinosoma Hampson, 1894

Genus of moths

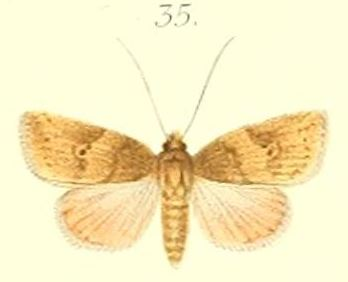
E. subrubra (drawing from 1899)

Erizada is a genus of moths of the family Nolidae.

== Species ==
- Erizada lichenaria Walker, 1865
- Erizada rufa Hampson 1905
