= Lasiolopha =

Scientific classification
- Kingdom: Animalia
- Phylum: Arthropoda
- Clade: Pancrustacea
- Class: Insecta
- Order: Lepidoptera
- Superfamily: Noctuoidea
- Family: Nolidae
- Subfamily: Chloephorinae
- Genus: Lasiolopha; Turner, 1920
- Species: L. saturata

Binomial name
- Lasiolopha saturata (Walker, 1865)

Synonyms
- Areola saturata Walker, 1865; Paracrama olivacea Hampson, 1893; Lasiolopha saturata Walker; Kobes, 1997

Genus of moths

Lasiolopha saturata is a moth of the family Nolidae first described by Francis Walker in 1865. It is the only species in the genus Lasiolopha. It is found in Oriental tropics of India, Sri Lanka, Thailand, New Guinea and Australia.

== Description ==
Forewings dark grayish green with two irregular green bands. Hindwings gray brownish with orange shades at the margin. The caterpillar has a greenish body with a lateral white line. Head orange with black markings. Thorax bulbous.

Larval food plant is Memecylon. Pupation occurs in a cocoon at the base of mid-rib. The cocoon is semi-ovoid and the pupa is ovoid.
