= Microzada =

Scientific classification
- Kingdom: Animalia
- Phylum: Arthropoda
- Clade: Pancrustacea
- Class: Insecta
- Order: Lepidoptera
- Superfamily: Noctuoidea
- Family: Nolidae
- Subfamily: Chloephorinae
- Genus: Microzada; Hampson, 1912

Type species
- Microzada anaemica Hampson, 1912

Genus of moths

Microzada is a genus of moths of the subfamily Chloephorinae and the family Nolidae. The genus was erected by George Hampson in 1912.

== Species ==
- Microzada amabilis (Saalmüller, 1891)
- Microzada anaemica Hampson, 1912
- Microzada similis Berio, 1956
- Microzada subrosea A. E. Prout, 1927
- Microzada vaovao Viette, 1988
