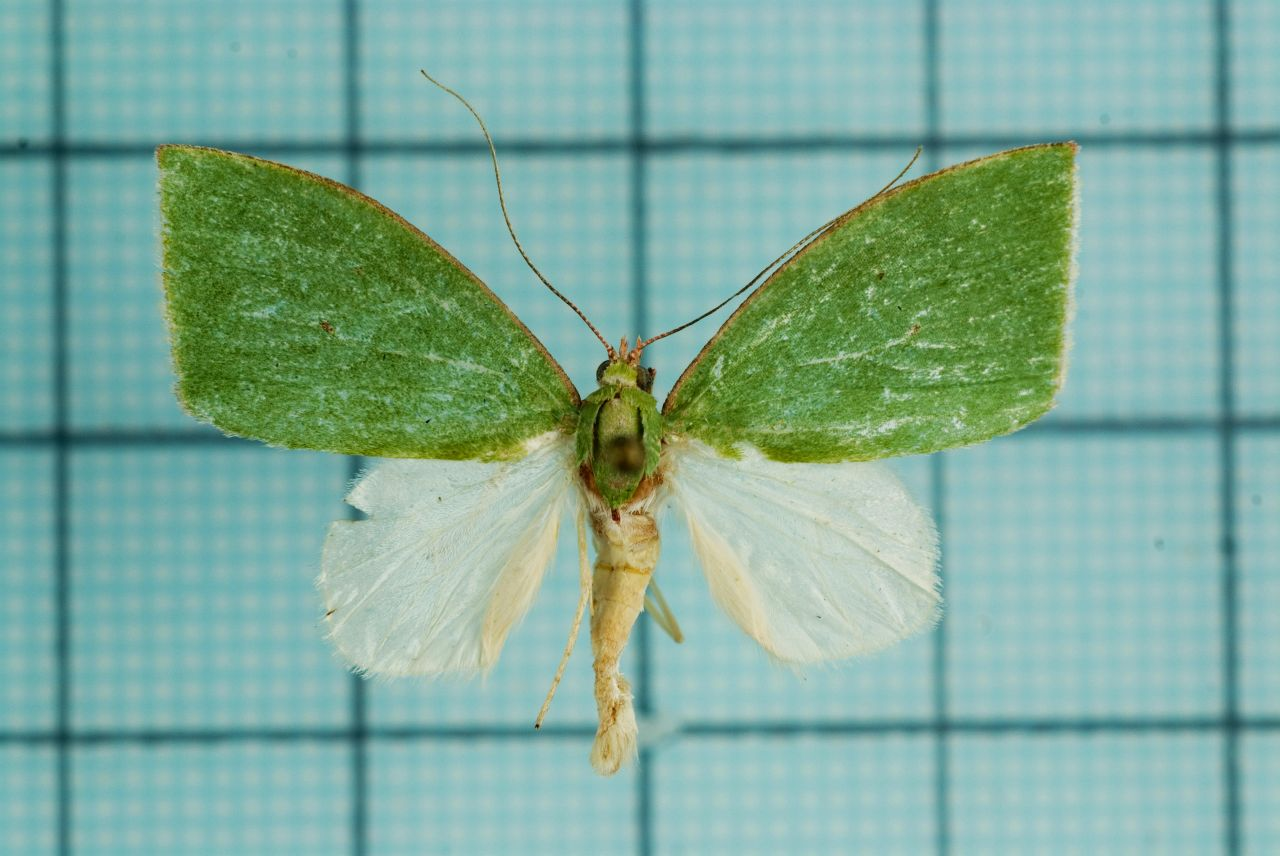

Scientific classification
- Kingdom: Animalia
- Phylum: Arthropoda
- Class: Insecta
- Order: Lepidoptera
- Superfamily: Noctuoidea
- Family: Nolidae
- Genus: Tyana
- Species: T. falcata

Binomial name
- Tyana falcata (Walker, 1866)

Synonyms
- Hylophila falcata Walker, 1866; Tyana acypera Hampson, 1905; Tyana acypera literata Wileman, 1910

= Tyana falcata =

Species of moth

Tyana falcata is a species of moth of the family Nolidae first described by Francis Walker in 1866. It is found in Taiwan.
