= Pterogonia nubes =

Scientific classification
- Kingdom: Animalia
- Phylum: Arthropoda
- Class: Insecta
- Order: Lepidoptera
- Superfamily: Noctuoidea
- Family: Erebidae
- Genus: Pterogonia
- Species: P. nubes

Binomial name
- Pterogonia nubes (Hampson, 1893)

Synonyms
- Craspedogonia nubes Hampson, 1893; Pterogonia nerissa Swinhoe, 1902; Pterogonia nubes Hampson; Kobes, 1997

Species of moth

Pterogonia nubes is a moth of the family Nolidae first described by George Hampson in 1893. It is found in Sri Lanka, Peninsular Malaysia, Sumatra, Borneo, the Philippines and Sulawesi.

== Description ==
Its forewings are dark reddish brown. A pale bluish-gray speckled streak is visible. Forewing margin of male is round and female is angled centrally.
