= Tornoconia mabillei =

Scientific classification
- Kingdom: Animalia
- Phylum: Arthropoda
- Clade: Pancrustacea
- Class: Insecta
- Order: Lepidoptera
- Superfamily: Noctuoidea
- Family: Nolidae
- Genus: Tornoconia
- Species: T. mabillei

Binomial name
- Tornoconia mabillei Viette, 1972

Species of moth

Tornoconia mabillei is a species of moth in the family Nolidae. It was described by Pierre E. L. Viette in 1972. This species can be found in Madagascar.
