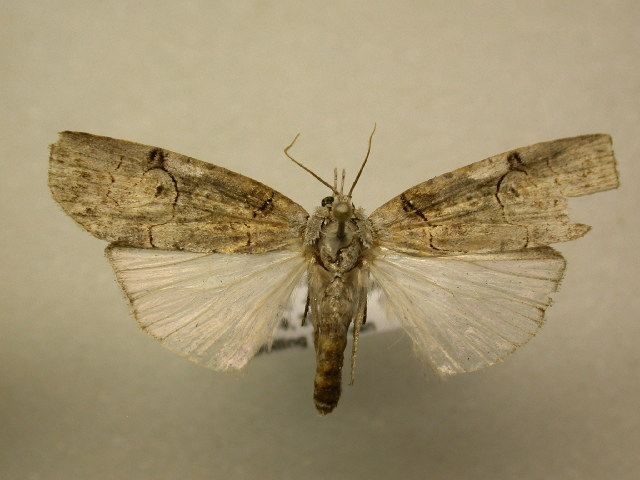
- Iscadia aperta

Scientific classification
- Kingdom: Animalia
- Phylum: Arthropoda
- Class: Insecta
- Order: Lepidoptera
- Superfamily: Noctuoidea
- Family: Nolidae
- Subfamily: Chloephorinae
- Genus: Iscadia; Walker, 1857

Synonyms
- Sebagena Walker, 1865; Libunca Walker, 1869; Pucialia Walker, 1869; Algonia Möschler, 1886; Encalypta Möschler, 1890; Lophosema Schaus, 1910; Lophosema Hampson, 1912

= Iscadia =

Genus of moths

Iscadia is a genus of moths of the family Nolidae. The genus was erected by Francis Walker in 1857.

== Species ==
- Iscadia acronyctoides (Schaus, 1915)
- Iscadia aperta Walker, 1857
- Iscadia argentea (Walker, 1869)
- Iscadia buckleyi Druce, 1910
- Iscadia canalalis (Schaus, 1938)
- Iscadia candezei (Druce, 1898)
- Iscadia cerussata (Felder, 1874)
- Iscadia chlorographa (Dognin, 1910)
- Iscadia commixta (Dognin, 1923)
- Iscadia costipallens (Bethune-Baker, 1906)
- Iscadia cuprea (Mell, 1943)
- Iscadia diopis Hampson, 1905
- Iscadia duckinfieldia Schaus, 1906
- Iscadia furcifera (Walker, 1865)
- Iscadia glaucograpta (Hampson, 1912)
- Iscadia hades (Lower, 1903)
- Iscadia mariva (Dognin, 1891)
- Iscadia metaphaea (Hampson, 1918)
- Iscadia mollis (Möschler, 1886)
- Iscadia montei Costa Lima, 1936
- Iscadia nigra Schaus, 1906
- Iscadia phaeoptera Dognin, 1910
- Iscadia poliochroa (Hampson, 1912)
- Iscadia poliopepla Hampson, 1905
- Iscadia producta (Dognin, 1900)
- Iscadia purpurascens (Schaus, 1910)
- Iscadia rectifera (Walker, 1865)
- Iscadia rectilinea (Dognin, 1910)
- Iscadia turneri (Bethune-Baker, 1906)
- Iscadia viettei (Berio, 1955)
