= Vizaga =

Scientific classification
- Kingdom: Animalia
- Phylum: Arthropoda
- Class: Insecta
- Order: Lepidoptera
- Superfamily: Noctuoidea
- Family: Nolidae
- Subfamily: Chloephorinae
- Genus: Vizaga; C. Swinhoe, 1901

Synonyms
- Parelydna Bethune-Baker, 1906

Genus of moths

Vizaga is a genus of moths of the family Nolidae. The genus was erected by Charles Swinhoe in 1901.

== Species ==
- Vizaga cyanea (Snellen, 1881)
- Vizaga mirabilis (Bethune-Baker, 1906)
