= Labanda chloromela =

Scientific classification
- Kingdom: Animalia
- Phylum: Arthropoda
- Class: Insecta
- Order: Lepidoptera
- Superfamily: Noctuoidea
- Family: Nolidae
- Genus: Labanda
- Species: L. chloromela

Binomial name
- Labanda chloromela (Walker, 1858)

Synonyms
- Diomea chloromela Walker, 1858

Species of moth

Labanda chloromela is a species of moth in the family Nolidae first described by Francis Walker in 1858. It is found in Sri Lanka.
