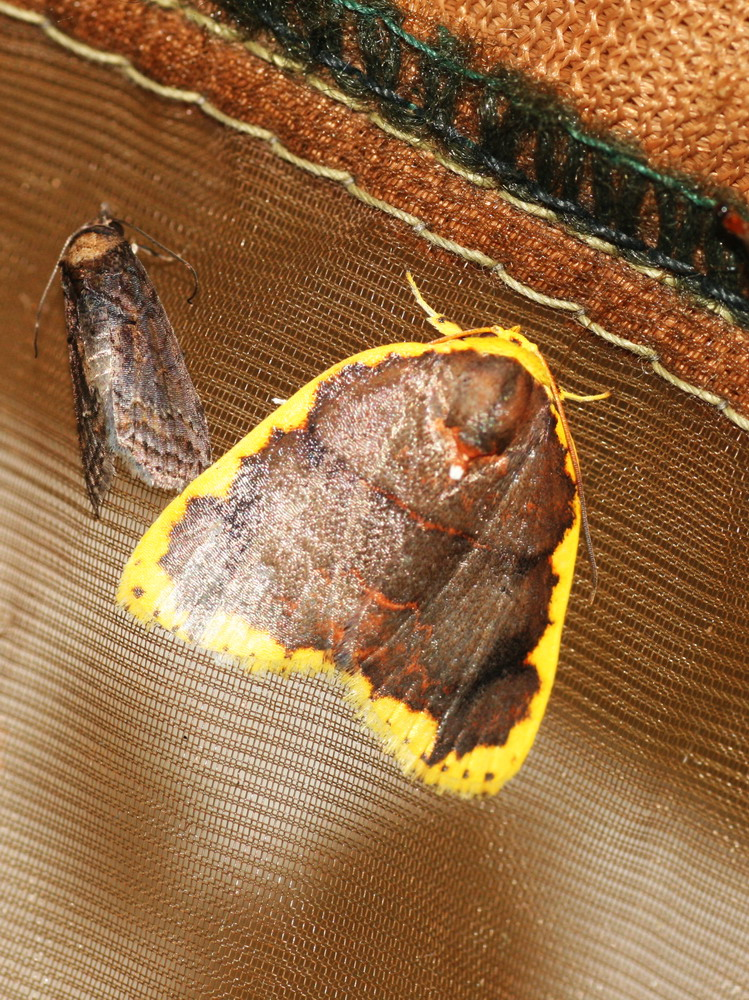

Scientific classification
- Domain: Eukaryota
- Kingdom: Animalia
- Phylum: Arthropoda
- Class: Insecta
- Order: Lepidoptera
- Superfamily: Noctuoidea
- Family: Nolidae
- Genus: Chandica
- Species: C. quadripennis

Binomial name
- Chandica quadripennis Moore, 1888

Synonyms
- Chandica gertae Kobes, 1997

= Chandica quadripennis =

Species of moth

Chandica quadripennis is a moth of the family Nolidae first described by Frederic Moore in 1888. It is found in the Himalayas, Peninsular Malaysia, Sumatra, and Borneo.
