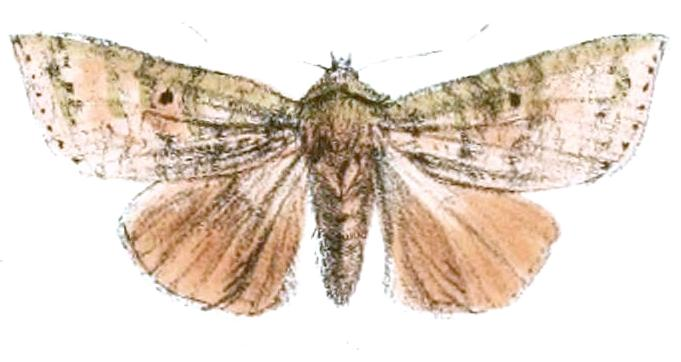

Scientific classification
- Kingdom: Animalia
- Phylum: Arthropoda
- Class: Insecta
- Order: Lepidoptera
- Superfamily: Noctuoidea
- Family: Nolidae
- Genus: Tympanistes
- Species: T. testacea

Binomial name
- Tympanistes testacea Moore, 1867

= Tympanistes testacea =

Species of moth

Tympanistes testacea is a species of moth of the family Nolidae. It is found in India.
