= Tornoconia =

Scientific classification
- Kingdom: Animalia
- Phylum: Arthropoda
- Class: Insecta
- Order: Lepidoptera
- Superfamily: Noctuoidea
- Family: Nolidae
- Subfamily: Chloephorinae
- Genus: Tornoconia; Berio, 1966

Genus of moths

Tornoconia is a genus of moths of the family Nolidae. The genus was erected by Emilio Berio in 1866.

== Species ==
- Tornoconia artemis Viette, 1972
- Tornoconia mabillei Viette, 1972
- Tornoconia panda Viette, 1972
- Tornoconia royi Berio, 1966
