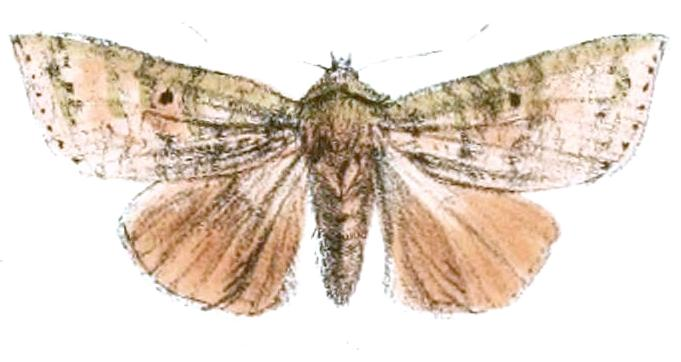
- Tympanistes testacea

Scientific classification
- Kingdom: Animalia
- Phylum: Arthropoda
- Class: Insecta
- Order: Lepidoptera
- Superfamily: Noctuoidea
- Family: Nolidae
- Subfamily: Chloephorinae
- Genus: Tympanistes; Moore, 1867

= Tympanistes =

Genus of moths

Tympanistes is a genus of moths of the family Nolidae. The genus was erected by Frederic Moore in 1867.

== Species ==
- Tympanistes alternata Warren, 1912
- Tympanistes flavescens C. Swinhoe, 1905
- Tympanistes fusimargo Prout, 1925
- Tympanistes pallida Moore, 1867
- Tympanistes rubidorsalis Moore, 1888
- Tympanistes rufimacula Warren, 1916
- Tympanistes testacea Moore, 1867
- Tympanistes yuennana Draudt, 1950
