= Labanda herbealis =

Scientific classification
- Kingdom: Animalia
- Phylum: Arthropoda
- Class: Insecta
- Order: Lepidoptera
- Superfamily: Noctuoidea
- Family: Nolidae
- Genus: Labanda
- Species: L. herbealis

Binomial name
- Labanda herbealis Walker, 1859

Species of moth

Labanda herbealis is a moth in the family Nolidae first described by Francis Walker in 1859. It is found in Sri Lanka and Borneo.

== Description ==
The forewings are green and black with a finely zigzag course to the fasciae. Postmedial and antemedial have grayish patches.
