= Labanda saturalis =

Scientific classification
- Kingdom: Animalia
- Phylum: Arthropoda
- Class: Insecta
- Order: Lepidoptera
- Superfamily: Noctuoidea
- Family: Nolidae
- Genus: Labanda
- Species: L. saturalis

Binomial name
- Labanda saturalis (Walker, 1865)

Synonyms
- Labanda saturalis Walker, 1865 [1866]; Bocana viridalis Moore, 1867

Species of moth

Labanda saturalis is a moth in the family Nolidae first described by Francis Walker in 1865. It is found in Indo-Australian tropics of India, Sri Lanka, and from New Guinea to the Solomon Islands.

== Description ==
The forewings have green and blackish variegation. A diffuse sub-dorsal white patch can be seen from the distal end to the postmedial. Transverse fasciae are pale green and irregular.
