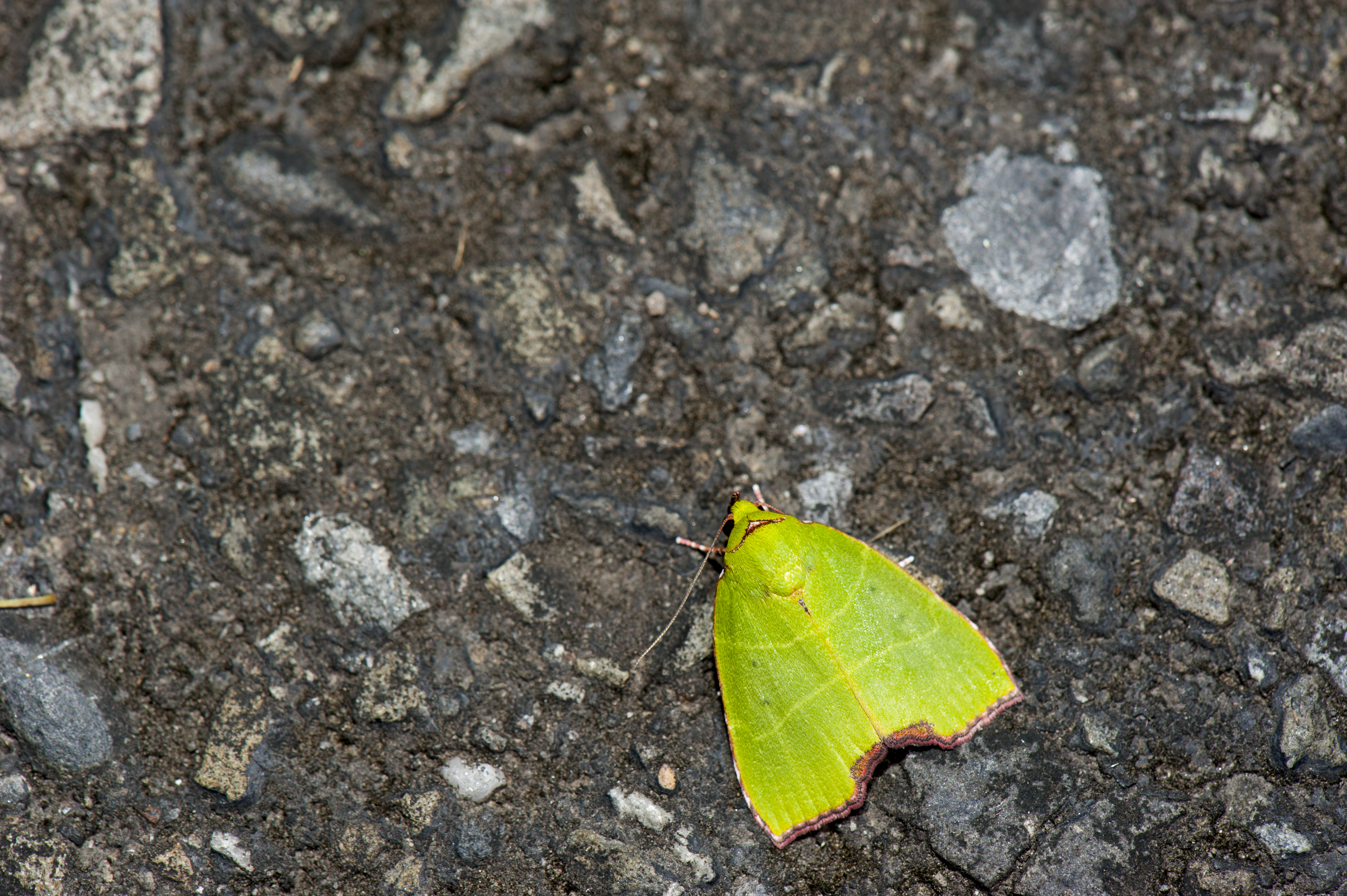
- Paracrama angulata

Scientific classification
- Domain: Eukaryota
- Kingdom: Animalia
- Phylum: Arthropoda
- Class: Insecta
- Order: Lepidoptera
- Superfamily: Noctuoidea
- Family: Nolidae
- Subfamily: Chloephorinae
- Genus: Paracrama; Moore, 1884

= Paracrama =

Genus of moths

Paracrama is a genus of tuft moths created by Frederic Moore in 1884.

== List of species ==
The following species are said to belong to Paracrama:

- Paracrama angulata Sugi
- Paracrama dulcissima (Walker, 1863)
- Paracrama latimargo (Warren, 1916)
