= Apothriguna =

Scientific classification
- Kingdom: Animalia
- Phylum: Arthropoda
- Class: Insecta
- Order: Lepidoptera
- Superfamily: Noctuoidea
- Family: Nolidae
- Subfamily: Chloephorinae
- Genus: Apothriguna; Berio, 1962
- Species: A. legrandi

Binomial name
- Apothriguna legrandi Berio, 1962

Genus of moths

Apothriguna is a monotypic moth genus of the family Nolidae. Its only species, Apothriguna legrandi, is endemic to the island of Mahé in the Seychelles. Both the genus and species were first described by Emilio Berio in 1962.

== See also ==
- List of moths of the Seychelles
