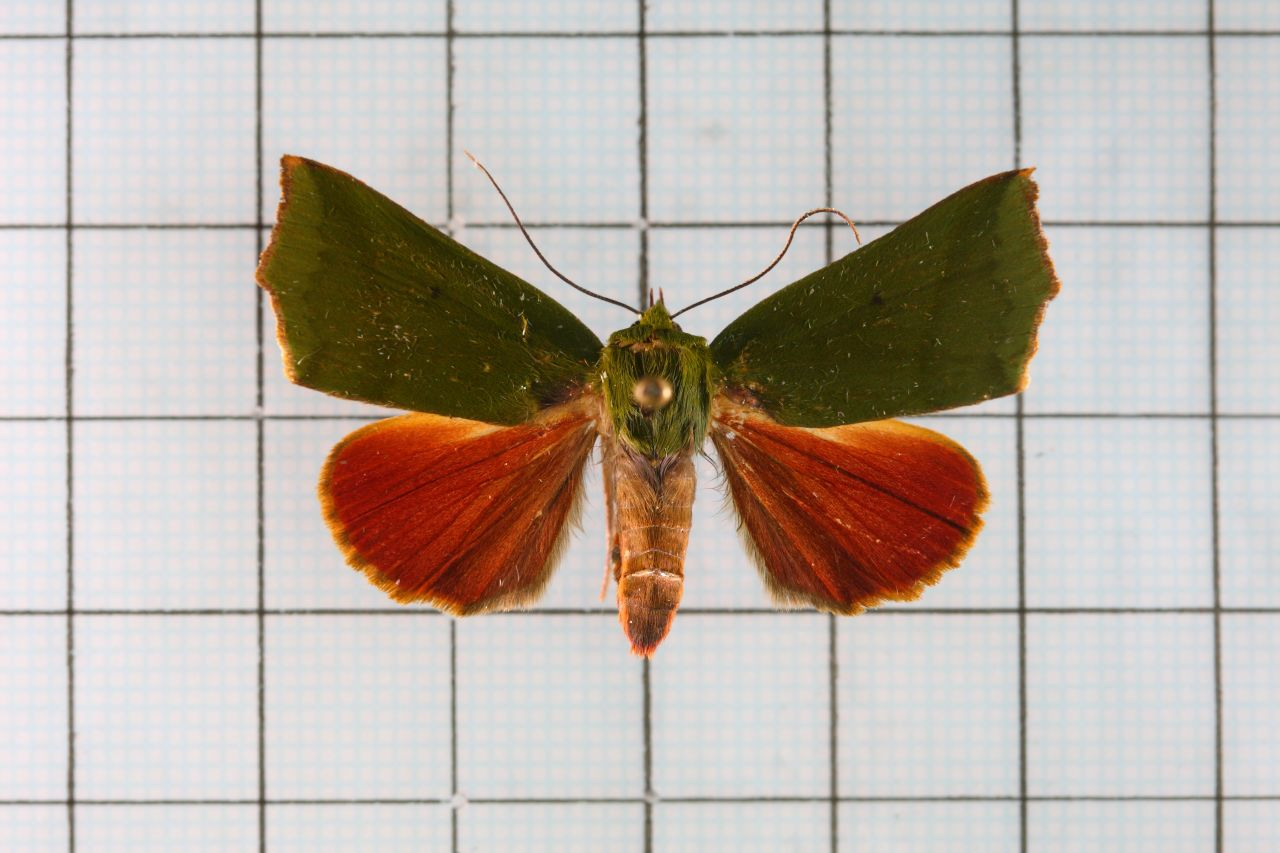
- Clethrophora distincta

Scientific classification
- Kingdom: Animalia
- Phylum: Arthropoda
- Class: Insecta
- Order: Lepidoptera
- Superfamily: Noctuoidea
- Family: Nolidae
- Subfamily: Chloephorinae
- Genus: Clethrophora; Hampson, 1894

= Clethrophora =

Genus of moths

Clethrophora is a genus of moths of the family Nolidae. The genus was erected by George Hampson in 1894.

== Species ==
- Clethrophora angulipennis A. E. Prout, 1924
- Clethrophora distincta (Leech, 1889)
- Clethrophora gonophora A. E. Prout, 1924
- Clethrophora virida (Heylaerts, 1890)
