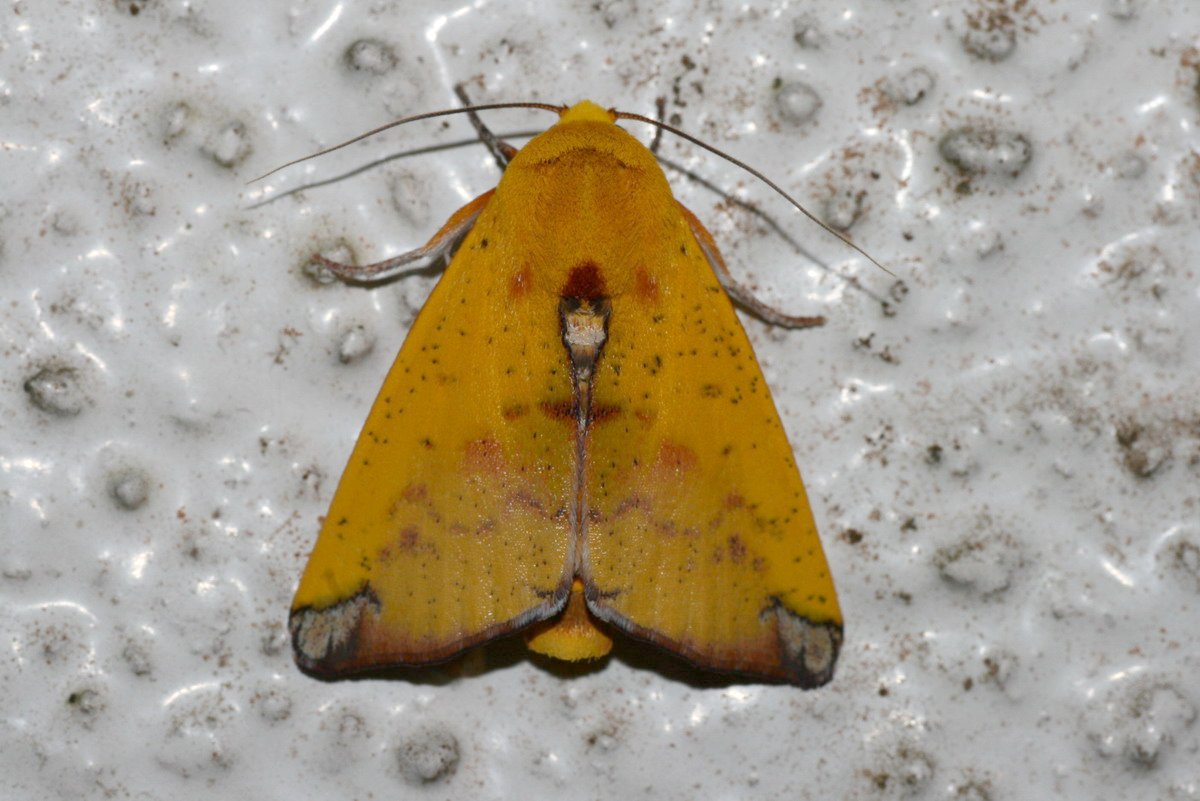

Scientific classification
- Kingdom: Animalia
- Phylum: Arthropoda
- Class: Insecta
- Order: Lepidoptera
- Superfamily: Noctuoidea
- Family: Nolidae
- Genus: Xenochroa
- Species: X. xanthia

Binomial name
- Xenochroa xanthia (Hampson, 1902)

Synonyms
- Carea xanthia Hampson, 1902; Pseudelydna xanthia ab. xanthiana Strand, 1917; Pseudelydna xanthia xanthiana Gaede, 1937; Pseudelydna xanthia (Hampson, 1902)

= Xenochroa xanthia =

Species of moth

Xenochroa xanthia is a moth of the family Nolidae first described by George Hampson in 1902. It is found in the north-eastern parts of the Himalayas, Singapore, Sumatra, Borneo and Palawan. It is found in lowland forests.
