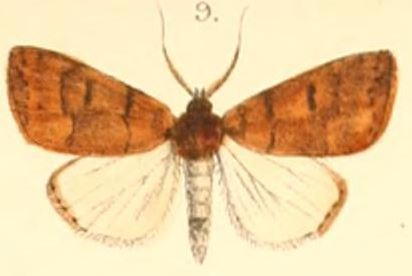
- Gelastocera castanea

Scientific classification
- Domain: Eukaryota
- Kingdom: Animalia
- Phylum: Arthropoda
- Class: Insecta
- Order: Lepidoptera
- Superfamily: Noctuoidea
- Family: Nolidae
- Subfamily: Chloephorinae
- Genus: Gelastocera; Butler, 1877

= Gelastocera =

Genus of moth

Gelastocera is a genus of moth in the family Nolidae.

== Species ==
- Gelastocera castanea Moore, 1879
- Gelastocera discalis Draudt, 1950
- Gelastocera eminentissima Bryk, 1948
- Gelastocera exusta Butler, 1877
- Gelastocera fuscibasis Draudt 1950
- Gelastocera hallasana Ronkay, 1998
- Gelastocera insignata Wileman, 1911
- Gelastocera kotshubeji Obraztsov, 1943
- Gelastocera motoyukiseinoi Kishida, 2010
- Gelastocera ochroleucana Staudinger, 1887
- Gelastocera rubicundula Wileman, 1911
- Gelastocera sutshana Obraztsov, 1950
- Gelastocera viridimacula Warren, 1916
