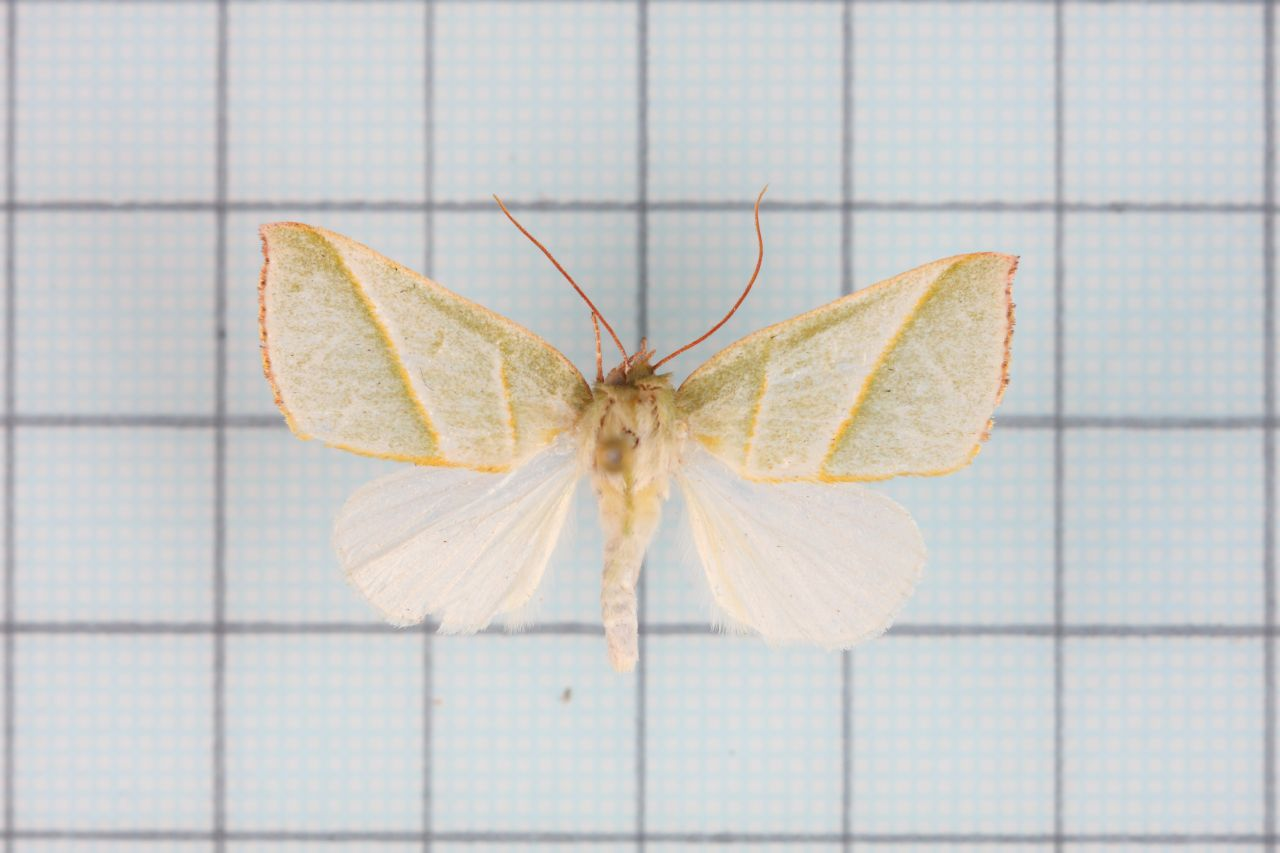

Scientific classification
- Domain: Eukaryota
- Kingdom: Animalia
- Phylum: Arthropoda
- Class: Insecta
- Order: Lepidoptera
- Superfamily: Noctuoidea
- Family: Nolidae
- Genus: Hylophilodes
- Species: H. tsukusensis

Binomial name
- Hylophilodes tsukusensis Nagano, 1918

Synonyms
- Hylophilodes pacifica Mell, 1943

= Hylophilodes tsukusensis =

Species of moth

Hylophilodes tsukusensis is a moth in the family Nolidae first described by Kikujiro Nagano in 1918. It is found in Japan and Taiwan.

The wingspan is 33–36 mm.

The larvae have been recorded feeding on Fagus species.
