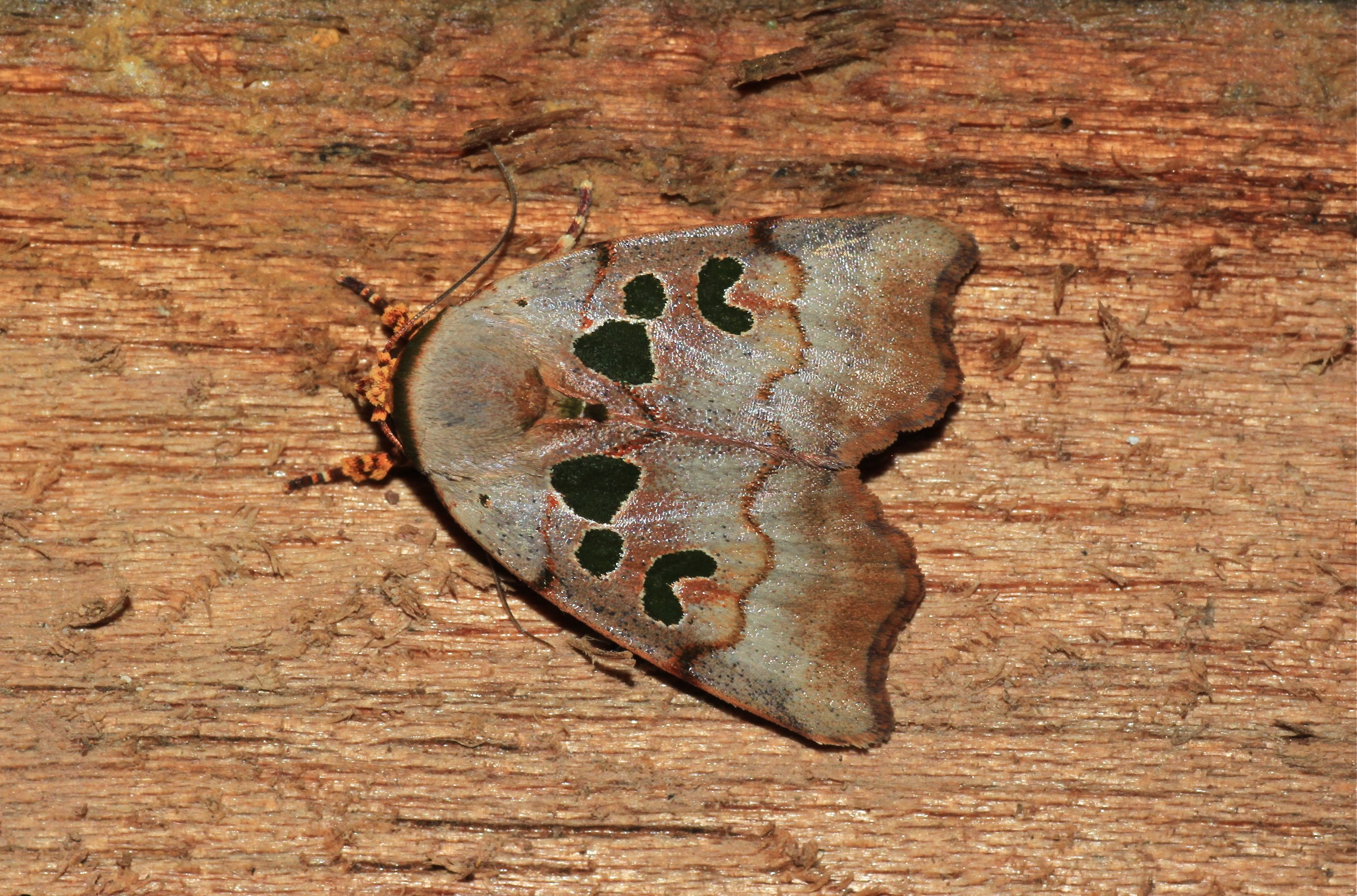

Scientific classification
- Kingdom: Animalia
- Phylum: Arthropoda
- Class: Insecta
- Order: Lepidoptera
- Superfamily: Noctuoidea
- Family: Nolidae
- Genus: Xenochroa
- Species: X. chlorostigma

Binomial name
- Xenochroa chlorostigma (Hampson, 1893)

Synonyms
- Carea chlorostigma Hampson, 1893; Dabareta tumidistigma Warren, 1916; Carea chlorostigma ab. borneonis Strand, 1917; Carea chlorostigma ab. sikkimensis Strand, 1917; Carea chlorostigma borneonis Gaede and sikkimensis Gaede, 1937; Carea chlorostigma Hampson; Holloway, 1976; Xenochroa chlorostigma Hampson; Kobes, 1997

= Xenochroa chlorostigma =

Species of moth

Xenochroa chlorostigma is a moth of the family Nolidae first described by George Hampson in 1893. It is found in India, Sri Lanka, Himalaya, Sundaland, Philippines and Sulawesi.

== Description ==
The female is larger than the male. Its forewings have a slightly falcate (sickle shaped) apex. Its reniform spot is conspicuous and dark green. Stigmata orbicular. A dark green patch found just posterior to the orbicular. The caterpillar has a distinct berry-shaped tumidity on its thoracic region. Only primary setae present. Bifid prominence and anal claspers dull black. Head green with orange body segments. Dorsal band olive-greenish brown with a dark dorsal line. A double white line runs laterally which is same as dorsal color, whitish or orange. Spiracular band orange with purple suffusion. Pupation occurs in a silken cocoon. Pupa lacks a cremaster. Cocoon buffy yellow with burnt patchy appearance.

Larval host plants are Eugenia, Memecylon edule and Syzygium.
