= Paraxestis =

Scientific classification
- Kingdom: Animalia
- Phylum: Arthropoda
- Class: Insecta
- Order: Lepidoptera
- Superfamily: Noctuoidea
- Family: Nolidae
- Subfamily: Chloephorinae
- Genus: Paraxestis; Hampson, 1902

Genus of moths

Paraxestis is a genus of moths of the family Nolidae. The genus was erected by George Hampson in 1902.

== Species ==
- Paraxestis malagasy Viette, 1988
- Paraxestis rufescens Hampson, 1902
