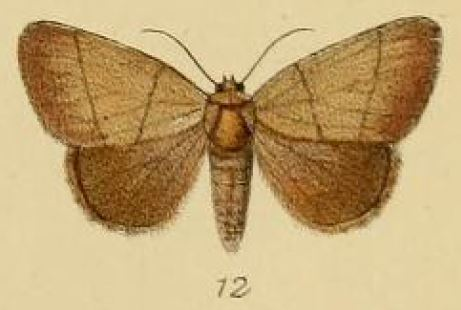
- Neonegeta pollusca

Scientific classification
- Kingdom: Animalia
- Phylum: Arthropoda
- Class: Insecta
- Order: Lepidoptera
- Superfamily: Noctuoidea
- Family: Nolidae
- Subfamily: Chloephorinae
- Genus: Neonegeta; Hampson, 1912

= Neonegeta =

Genus of moths

Neonegeta is a genus of moths in the family Nolidae. The genus was erected by George Hampson in 1912.

== Species ==
- Neonegeta arboccoae Berio, 1987
- Neonegeta atriflava Hampson, 1912
- Neonegeta pollusca (Schaus, 1893)
- Neonegeta purpurea Hampson, 1912
- Neonegeta trigonica (Hampson, 1905)
- Neonegeta xanthobasis (Hampson, 1905)
- Neonegeta zelia (Druce, 1887)
