= Plusiocalpe =

Scientific classification
- Domain: Eukaryota
- Kingdom: Animalia
- Phylum: Arthropoda
- Class: Insecta
- Order: Lepidoptera
- Superfamily: Noctuoidea
- Family: Nolidae
- Subfamily: Chloephorinae
- Genus: Plusiocalpe; Holland, 1894

Genus of moths

Plusiocalpe is a genus of moths of the family Nolidae. The genus was erected by William Jacob Holland in 1894.

== Species ==
- Plusiocalpe atlanta Viette, 1968
- Plusiocalpe micans (Saalmüller, 1891)
- Plusiocalpe pallida Holland, 1894
- Plusiocalpe sericina (Mabille, 1900)
