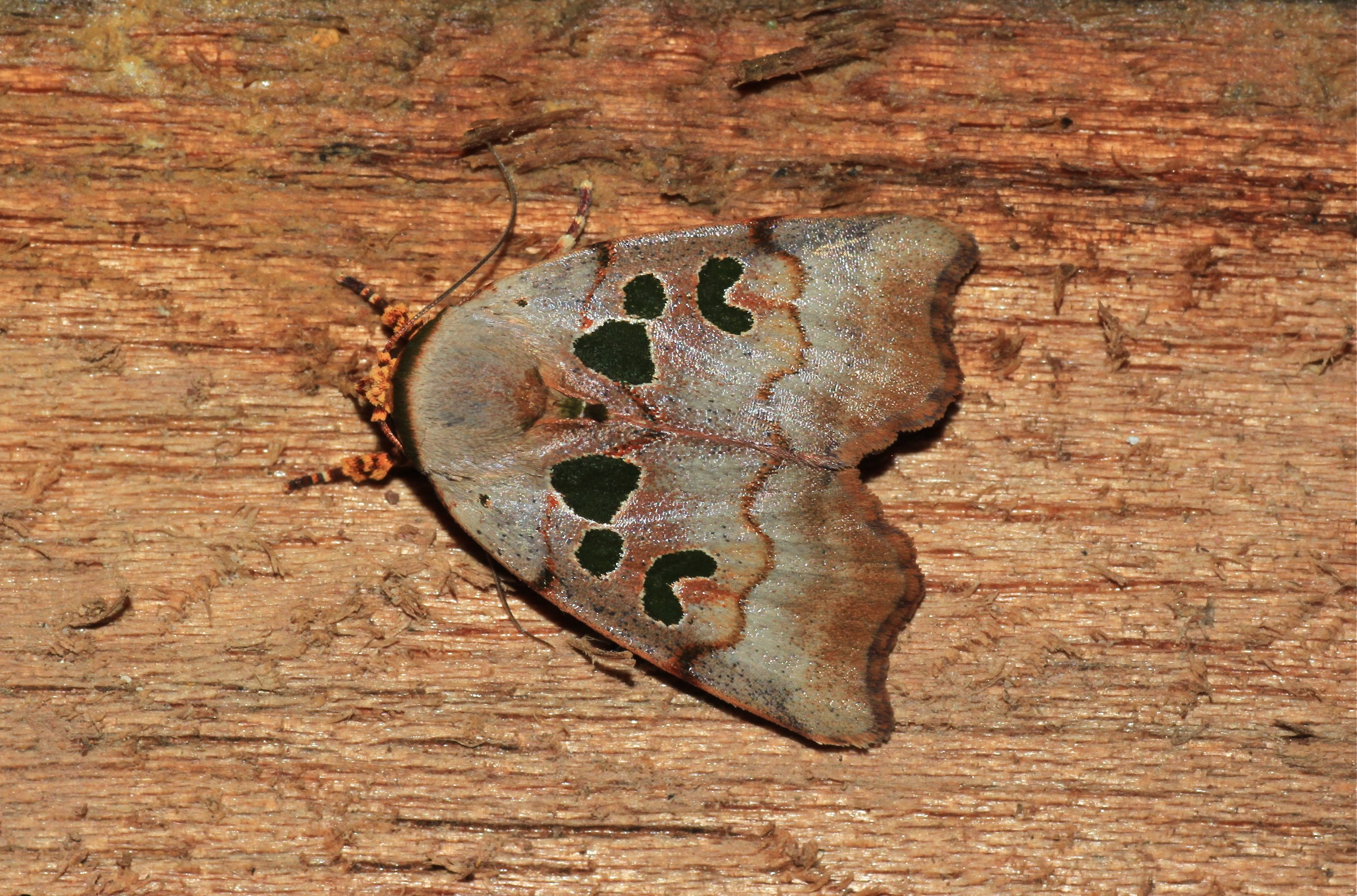
- Male Xenochroa chlorostigma

Scientific classification
- Kingdom: Animalia
- Phylum: Arthropoda
- Clade: Pancrustacea
- Class: Insecta
- Order: Lepidoptera
- Superfamily: Noctuoidea
- Family: Nolidae
- Subfamily: Chloephorinae
- Genus: Xenochroa; Felder, 1874

= Xenochroa =

Genus of moths

Xenochroa is a genus of moths of the family Nolidae. The genus was described by Felder in 1874.

== Species ==
- Xenochroa adoxa (Prout, 1924)
- Xenochroa annae (C. Swinhoe, 1904)
- Xenochroa argentipuncta (Holloway, 1976)
- Xenochroa argentipurpurea (Holloway, 1976)
- Xenochroa argentiviridis (Holloway, 1976)
- Xenochroa balteata (Warren, 1912)
- Xenochroa biviata (Hampson, 1905)
- Xenochroa calva (Warren, 1916)
- Xenochroa careoides (Warren, 1912)
- Xenochroa chlorostigma (Hampson, 1893)
- Xenochroa costiplaga (C. Swinhoe, 1893)
- Xenochroa diagona (Hampson, 1912)
- Xenochroa diluta (Warren, 1912)
- Xenochroa dohora Kobes, 1997
- Xenochroa ferrinigra (Holloway, 1976)
- Xenochroa ferriviridis (Holloway, 1976)
- Xenochroa fulvescens (Warren, 1912)
- Xenochroa fuscomarginata (Hampson, 1894)
- Xenochroa fuscosa (A. E. Prout, 1928)
- Xenochroa leucocraspis (Hampson, 1905)
- Xenochroa mathilda (C. Swinhoe, 1904)
- Xenochroa mediogrisea (Warren, 1912)
- Xenochroa minima (Warren, 1916)
- Xenochroa moira (C. Swinhoe, 1893)
- Xenochroa notodontina Felder, 1874
- Xenochroa obvia (Hampson, 1912)
- Xenochroa perspicua (Prout, 1922)
- Xenochroa pinkeri (Kobes, 1988)
- Xenochroa plesiogramma (A. E. Prout, 1926)
- Xenochroa pryeri (H. Druce, 1911)
- Xenochroa purpurea (Hampson, 1891)
- Xenochroa purpureolineata (Hampson, 1918)
- Xenochroa ronkayi Kobes, 1997
- Xenochroa rubrifusa (Hampson, 1905)
- Xenochroa sibolgae (Roepke, 1935)
- Xenochroa transpurpuralis (Holloway, 1976)
- Xenochroa triguttata (Warren, 1916)
- Xenochroa trilineata (Warren, 1912)
- Xenochroa trimacula (Strand, 1920)
- Xenochroa verticata (Warren, 1916)
- Xenochroa xanthia (Hampson, 1902)
