= Plectothripa =

Scientific classification
- Kingdom: Animalia
- Phylum: Arthropoda
- Class: Insecta
- Order: Lepidoptera
- Superfamily: Noctuoidea
- Family: Nolidae
- Subfamily: Chloephorinae
- Genus: Plectothripa; Hampson, 1918
- Species: P. excisa

Binomial name
- Plectothripa excisa Hampson, 1918

Genus of moths

Plectothripa is a monotypic moth genus of the family Nolidae. Its only species, Plectothripa excisa, is found in Peninsular Malaysia, Singapore, Sumatra, Borneo and Sulawesi. Both the genus and species were first described by George Hampson in 1818.
