= Plusiocalpe micans =

Scientific classification
- Kingdom: Animalia
- Phylum: Arthropoda
- Clade: Pancrustacea
- Class: Insecta
- Order: Lepidoptera
- Superfamily: Noctuoidea
- Family: Nolidae
- Genus: Plusiocalpe
- Species: P. micans

Binomial name
- Plusiocalpe micans (Saalmüller, 1891)

Synonyms
- Eregma micans Saalmüller, 1891

Species of moth

Plusiocalpe micans is a moth of the family Nolidae first described by Max Saalmüller in 1891. It is found in Madagascar. The wingspan of the adult moths is 24–29 mm.
