= Urbona =

Scientific classification
- Kingdom: Animalia
- Phylum: Arthropoda
- Class: Insecta
- Order: Lepidoptera
- Superfamily: Noctuoidea
- Family: Nolidae
- Subfamily: Chloephorinae
- Genus: Urbona; Walker, 1862

Synonyms
- Nagasena

Genus of moths

Urbona was a genus of moths of the family Nolidae erected by Francis Walker in 1862. It is now considered a synonym of Negeta.

== Description ==
Palpi slender and naked, where the third joint reaching above vertex of head. Antennae with long cilia in male. Thorax and abdomen smoothly scaled, except for a slight tuft on first segment of abdomen. Tibia moderately hairy. Forewings with somewhat rounded apex. Inner margin lobed near base. Retinaculum is bar shaped in male. Hindwings with vein 5 from lower angle of cell.

== Species ==
- Urbona abbreviata (Warren, 1916)
- Urbona albescens (Moore, 1882)
- Urbona chlorocrota (Hampson, 1907)
- Urbona dentilinealis (Moore, 1877)
- Urbona lacteata Hampson, 1910
- Urbona leucophaea (Walker, [1863])
- Urbona nivea (Hampson, 1902)
- Urbona sublineata Walker, 1862
- Urbona tamsi (Eecke, 1924)
