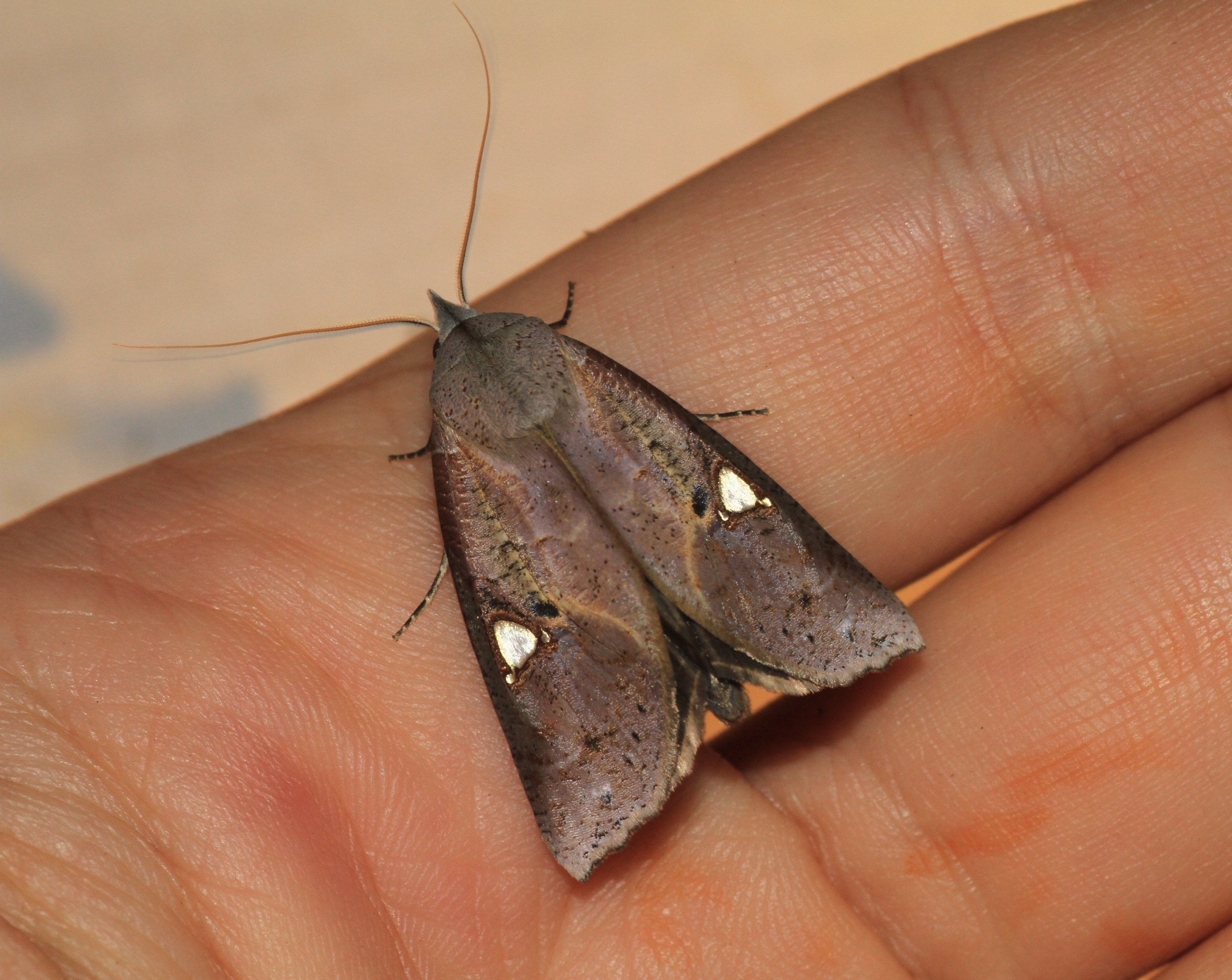

Scientific classification
- Domain: Eukaryota
- Kingdom: Animalia
- Phylum: Arthropoda
- Class: Insecta
- Order: Lepidoptera
- Superfamily: Noctuoidea
- Family: Erebidae
- Subfamily: Calpinae
- Genus: Pterogonia; Swinhoe, 1891

= Pterogonia =

Genus of moths

Pterogonia is a genus of moths of the family Nolidae described by Swinhoe in 1891.

== Description ==
Palpi obliquely upturned and reaching above a sharp frontal tuft. Forewings with straight costa. Outer margin angled at vein 3. Veins 8 and 9 anastomosing to form an areole. The retinaculum is bar-shaped in male. Hindwings with vein 8 anastomosing with vein 7 to middle of cell. Vein 5 from near lower angle of cell.

== Species ==
- Pterogonia aurigutta (Walker, 1858)
- Pterogonia cardinalis Holloway, 1976
- Pterogonia cassidata Warren, 1916
- Pterogonia episcopalis Swinhoe, 1891
- Pterogonia nubes (Hampson, 1893)
