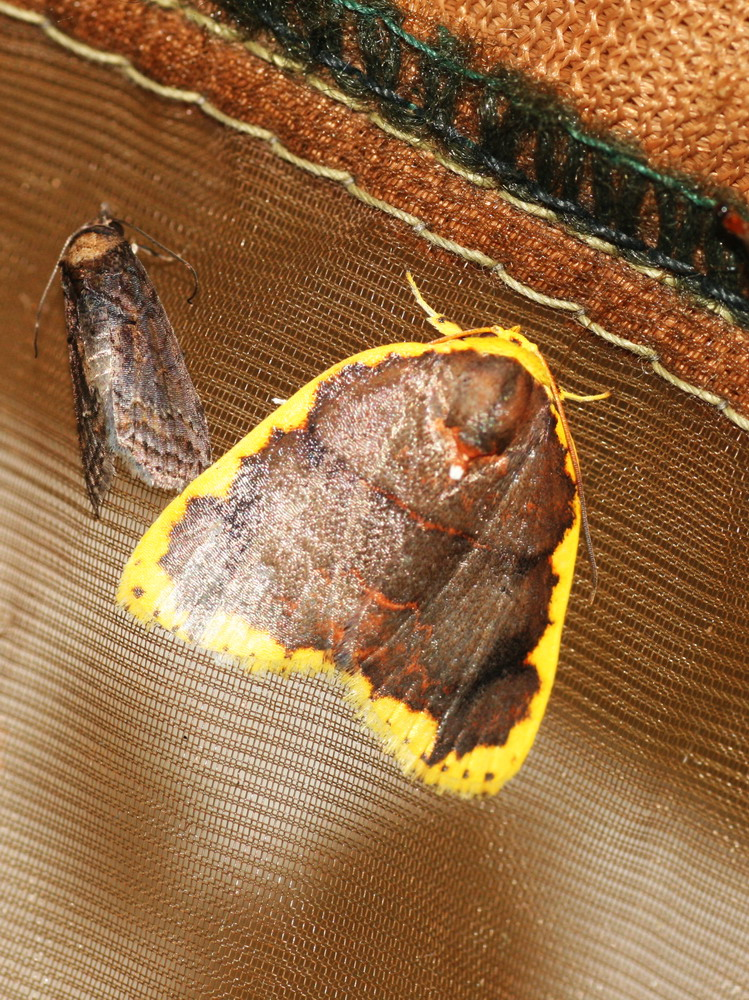
- Chandica quadripennis

Scientific classification
- Domain: Eukaryota
- Kingdom: Animalia
- Phylum: Arthropoda
- Class: Insecta
- Order: Lepidoptera
- Superfamily: Noctuoidea
- Family: Nolidae
- Genus: Chandica; Moore, 1888

Species
- Chandica ayama Kobes, 1988; Chandica quadripennis Moore, 1888; Chandica radula Holloway, 2003

= Chandica =

Genus of moths

Chandica is a genus of moths of the family Nolidae erected by Frederic Moore in 1888.
