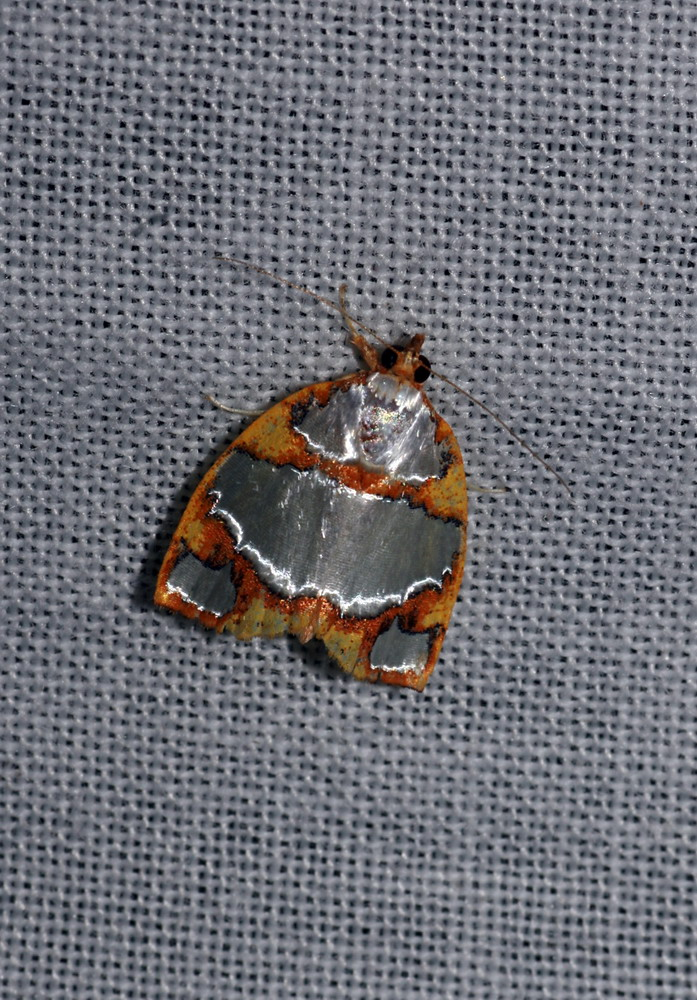
- Titulcia eximia

Scientific classification
- Domain: Eukaryota
- Kingdom: Animalia
- Phylum: Arthropoda
- Class: Insecta
- Order: Lepidoptera
- Superfamily: Noctuoidea
- Family: Nolidae
- Subfamily: Chloephorinae
- Genus: Titulcia; Walker, 1864

= Titulcia (moth) =

Genus of moths

Titulcia is a genus of moths of the family Nolidae. The genus was erected by Francis Walker in 1864.

== Species ==
- Titulcia argyroplaga Hampson, 1912 Myanmar
- Titulcia confictella Walker, 1864 Borneo, north-eastern Hiamalayas, Taiwan, Myanmar, Thailand, Peninsular Malaysia, Sumatra, Palawan
- Titulcia eximia Walker, 1864 Borneo, Myanmar (Mergui Archipelago), Peninsular Malaysia, Sumatra
- Titulcia javensis Warren, 1916 Java, Sumatra
- Titulcia meterythra Hampson, 1905 Borneo, Peninsular Malaysia, Sumatra
- Titulcia rufimargo Hampson, 1912 Borneo, Sumatra, Java
