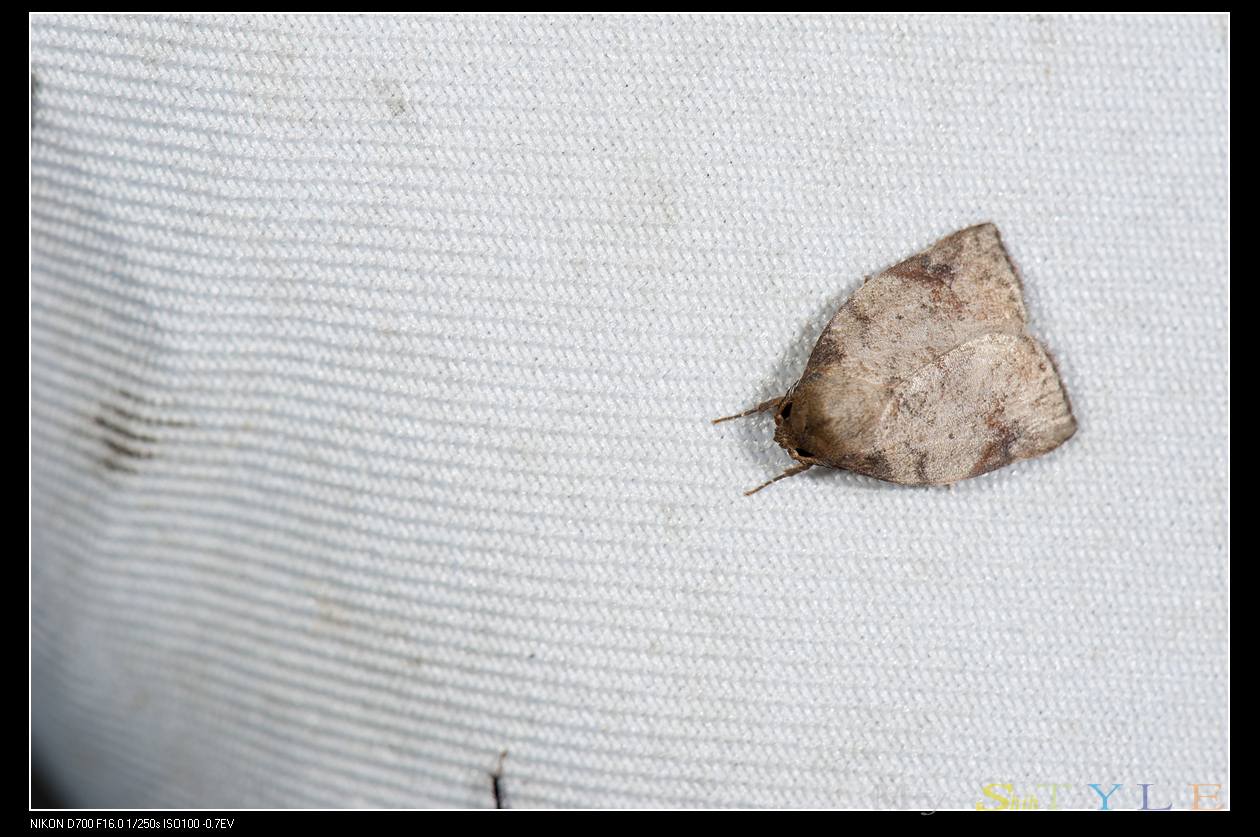

Scientific classification
- Kingdom: Animalia
- Phylum: Arthropoda
- Class: Insecta
- Order: Lepidoptera
- Superfamily: Noctuoidea
- Family: Nolidae
- Genus: Beara
- Species: B. tortriciformis

Binomial name
- Beara tortriciformis (Strand, 1917)

Synonyms
- Hylophilodes tortriciformis Strand, 1917; Beara dilatata Holloway, 1982

= Beara tortriciformis =

Species of moth

Beara tortriciformis is a moth in the family Nolidae first described by Strand in 1917. It is found in Taiwan, the north-eastern Himalayas, Peninsular Malaysia, Sumatra and Borneo.
