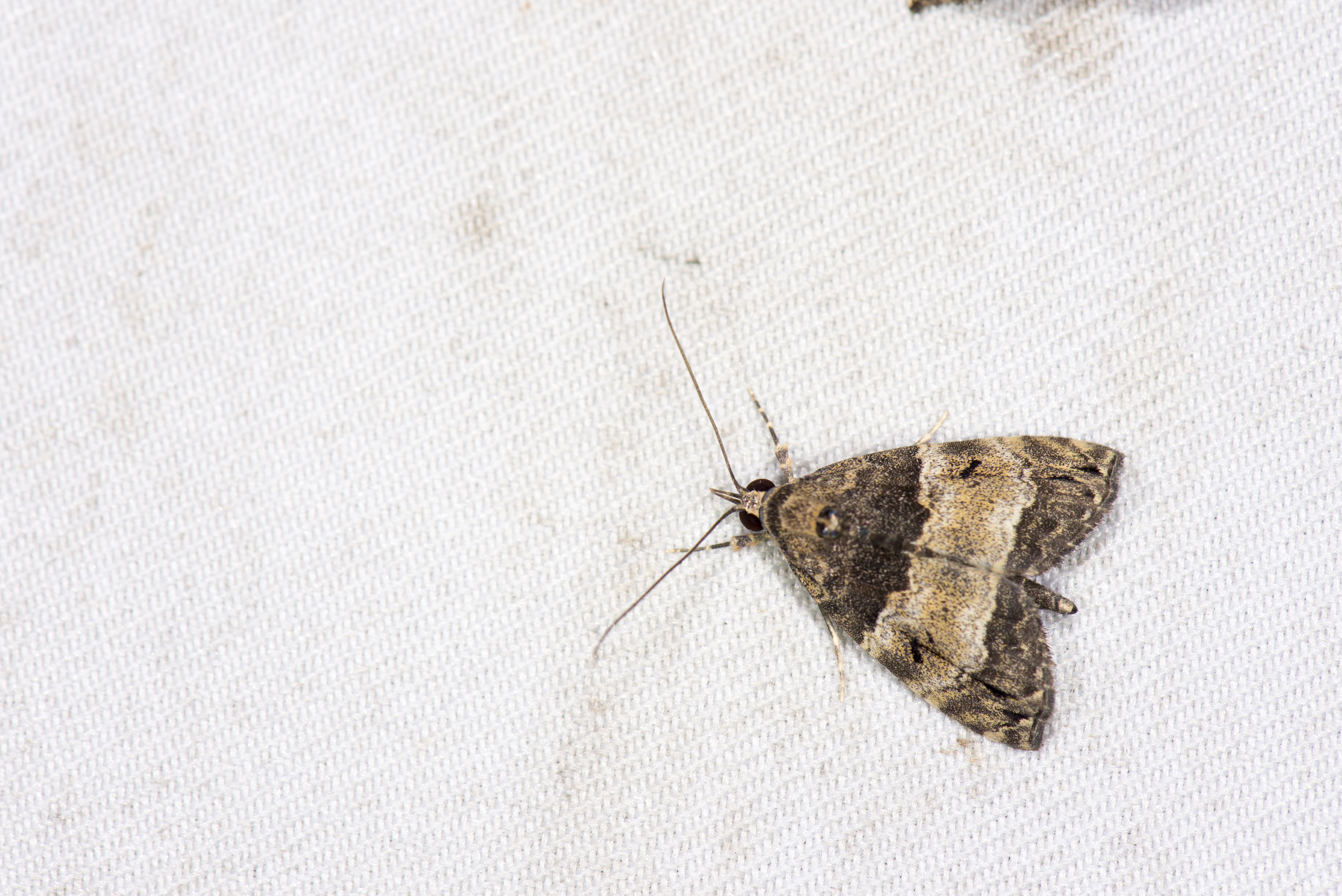
- Labanda

Scientific classification
- Kingdom: Animalia
- Phylum: Arthropoda
- Class: Insecta
- Order: Lepidoptera
- Superfamily: Noctuoidea
- Family: Nolidae
- Genus: Labanda; Walker, 1859

Synonyms
- Bariana Walker, 1865; Gerbatha Walker, 1865; Lazanda Walker, 1865; Pseudalea Turner, 1936

= Labanda =

Genus of moths

Labanda is a genus of moths of the family Nolidae erected by Francis Walker in 1859.

== Description ==
Papi smoothly scaled, where the second joint reaching vertex of head and third joint long and naked. Antennae very long and slender, minutely ciliated in male. Thorax smoothly scaled. Abdomen slender, with dorsal tufts on the first two segments, and usually extending far beyond the hindwings. Tibia almost naked. Forewings with round apex. The outer margin evenly curved. Hindwings with vein 5 from lower angle of cell.

== Species ==
- Labanda achine (Felder & Rogenhofer, 1874)
- Labanda affinis Hulstaert, 1924
- Labanda bryochlora Hampson, 1902 South Africa
- Labanda carinata Holloway, 2003 Borneo
- Labanda ceylusalis Walker, 1859 Peninsular Malaysia, Borneo, Palawan, Sulawesi
- Labanda chloromela (Walker, 1858)
- Labanda concinna Holloway, 2003 Borneo
- Labanda contrastriatula Holloway, 2003 Borneo, Peninsular Malaysia
- Labanda dentilinea (Walker, 1863) Borneo, Peninsular Malaysia
- Labanda fasciata (Walker, 1865)
- Labanda herbealis Walker, 1859 Sri Lanka, Borneo
- Labanda huntei Warren, 1903 Queensland
- Labanda keyalis Gaede, 1937
- Labanda nebulosa Candèze, 1927
- Labanda palliviridis Holloway, 2003 Borneo, Peninsular Malaysia, north-east Himalayas
- Labanda quadralis Holloway, 2003 Borneo
- Labanda saturalis Walker, [1866] Indo-Australian tropics (India–Solomons)
- Labanda semipars (Walker, 1858) Sri Lanka
- Labanda striatula Holloway, 2003 Borneo
- Labanda submuscosa (Walker, 1865) Java
- Labanda umbrosa Hampson, 1912 Myanmar, Peninsular Malaysia, Borneo
- Labanda umonea Holloway, 2003 Borneo
- Labanda viridalis Swinhoe, 1905
- Labanda viridumbrosa Holloway, 2003 Borneo
