= Gabala (moth) =

Scientific classification
- Kingdom: Animalia
- Phylum: Arthropoda
- Class: Insecta
- Order: Lepidoptera
- Superfamily: Noctuoidea
- Family: Nolidae
- Subfamily: Chloephorinae
- Genus: Gabala; Walker, [1866]

Synonyms
- Lampadephora Turner, 1932

Genus of moths

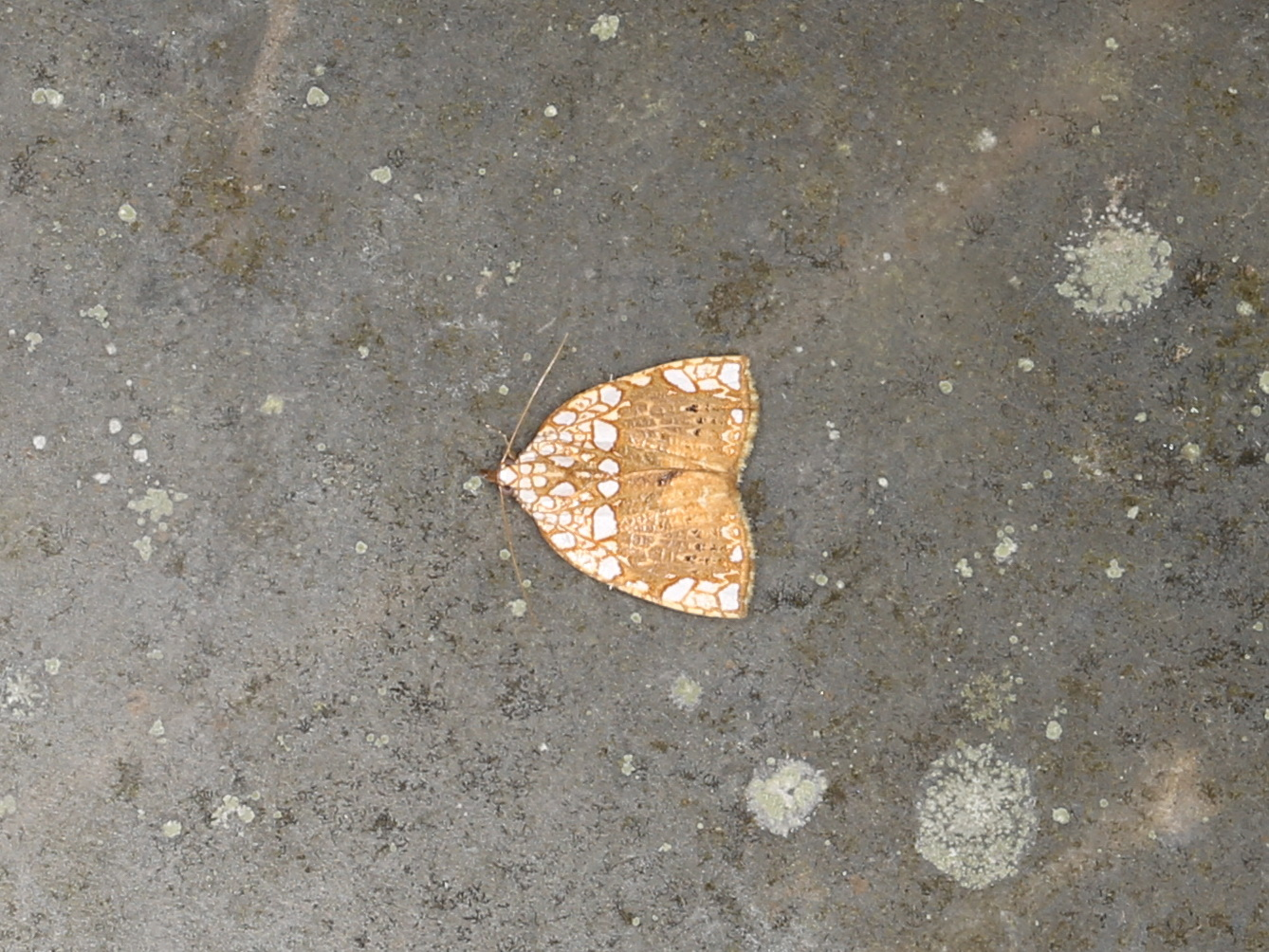
Gabala sp., 2018

Gabala is a genus of moths in the family Nolidae. The genus was erected by Francis Walker in 1866.

== Species ==
- Gabala argentata Butler, 1878 Japan
- Gabala australiata Warren, 1916 northern Queensland
- Gabala flavicosta Warren, 1916 New Guinea
- Gabala flavimargo Warren, 1916 Timor
- Gabala grjebinella (Viette, 1956) Comoros
- Gabala hilaris Warren, 1916 Sambawa
- Gabala margarita Bethune-Baker, 1908 New Guinea
- Gabala polyspilalis Walker, [1866] India
- Gabala quadrinigrata Warren, 1916 Kai Kecil
- Gabala sanguinata Warren, 1916 Java
