= Timeline of entomology – prior to 1800 =

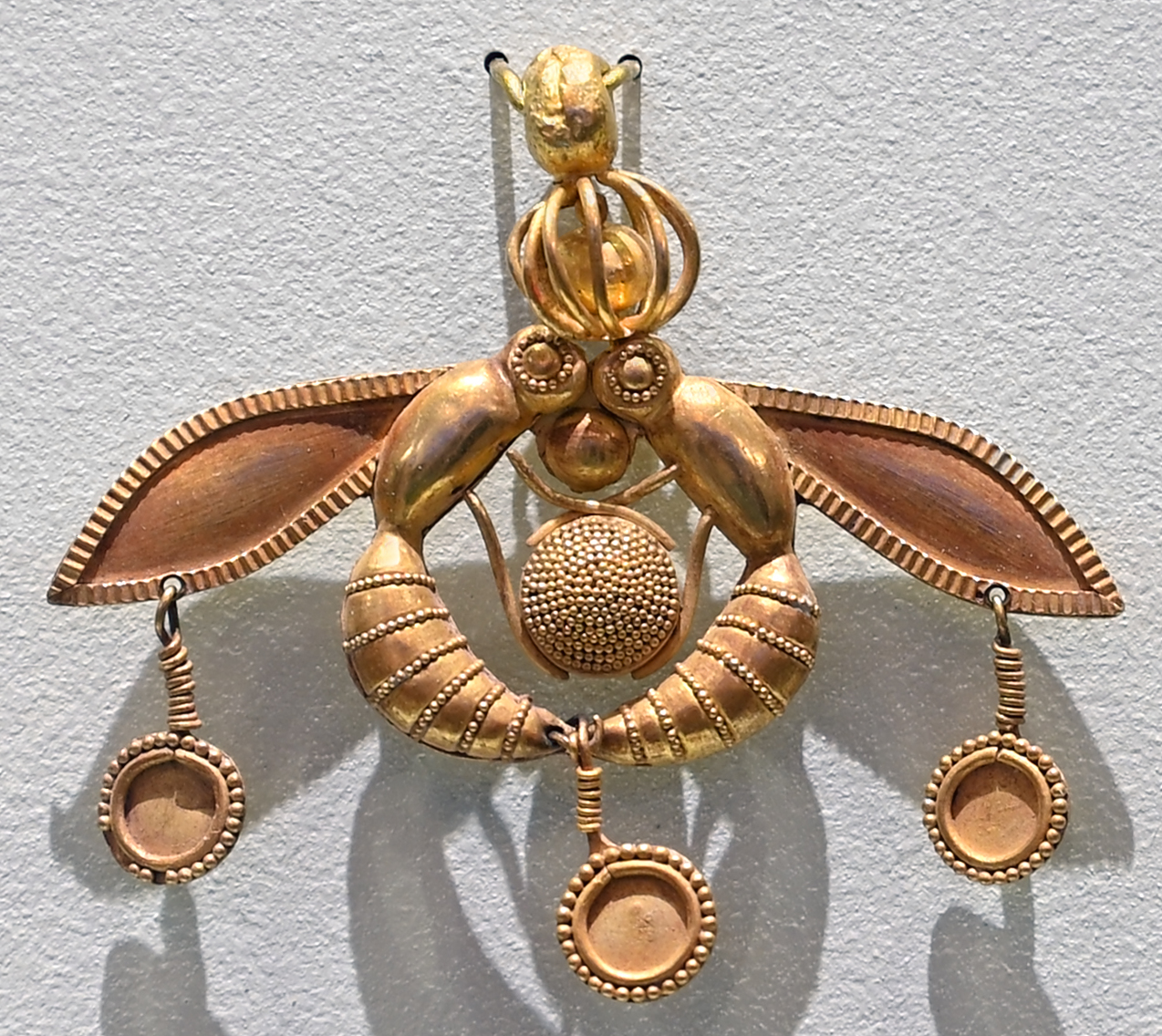
1800–1700 BC, Minoan jewellery, Malia, Crete: two golden bees over a honey comb

Entomology, the scientific study of insects and closely related terrestrial arthropods, has been impelled by the necessity of societies to protect themselves from insect-borne diseases, crop losses to pest insects, and insect-related discomfort, as well as by people's natural curiosity. Though many significant developments in the field happened only recently, in the 19th–20th centuries, the history of entomology stretches back to prehistory.

== Prehistory ==
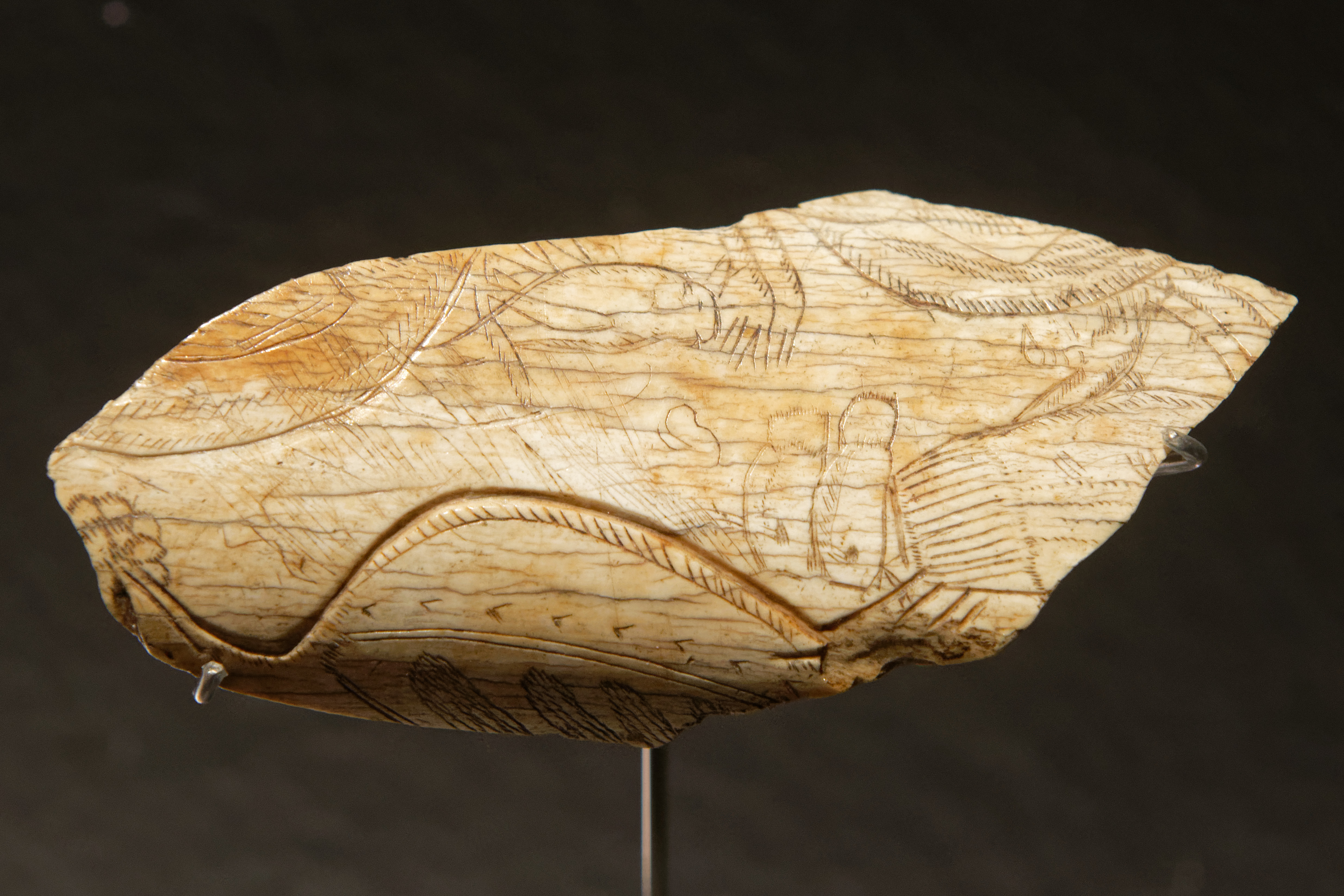
Cave cricket engraved on a fragment of bison bone c. 13,000 BC found at the junction of Trois-Frères with the Grotte d'Enlène

- 13,000 BC – The earliest evidence of man's interest in insects is from rock paintings. The insects depicted are bees. A carving of a cave cricket from the Cave of the Trois-Frères is similarly dated.
- 1800–1700 BC – Bees were significant in other early civilisations, for instance at Malia, Crete, where jewellery depicts two golden bees holding a drop of honey.

== Egypt, Greek and Roman empires ==
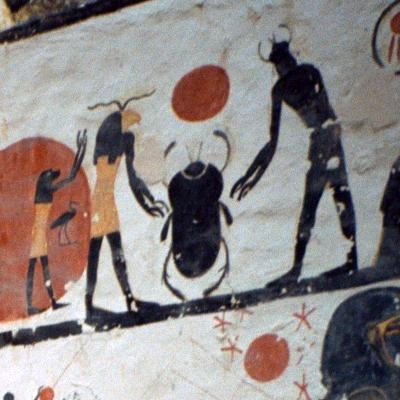
A scarab beetle, depicted on the walls of Tomb KV6 in the Valley of the Kings

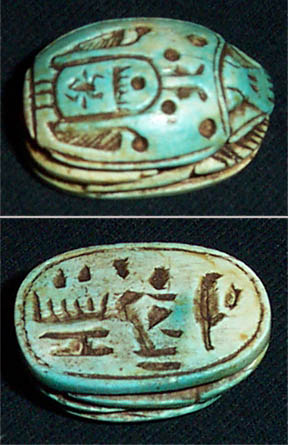
A carved steatite scarab amulet, c. 550 BC

- 1000 BC – A sacred scarab beetle, held to be sacred by the Ancient Egyptians, is painted on wall of Rameses IX's tomb. Bee-keeping was particularly well developed in Egypt and was discussed by the Roman writers Virgil, Gaius Julius Hyginus, Varro and Columella.
- 620–560 BC – Aesop's Fables relate stories of grasshoppers, ants and other insects.
- c. 343 BC – Aristotle writes History of Animals In this work Aristotle includes insects in a class "Entoma" which also includes the arachnids and the myriapods but not the Crustacea which formed another class "Malacostraca" of the "Anaema" or "bloodless animals." (Insecta is the Latin translation of Aristotle's Greek εντομον, Entomon. Parts of Animals on zoological anatomy followed. For nearly 2000 years the few writers who dealt with zoological subjects followed Aristotle's leading.
- 77–79 AD – Pliny the Elder publishes Naturalis Historia
- 847 AD – Rabanus Maurus authors the encyclopaedia De rerum naturis ('On the Nature of Things').

== 10th–15th centuries ==
- Medieval period – the great chain of being, a hierarchical structure of all matter and life thought to be decreed by God, is developed throughout medieval Christianity. It has its origins in Plato, Aristotle (in his Historia Animalium), Plotinus and Proclus.
- 1061 – Shen Kuo described the role of predatory insects in protecting crops from insect pests.
- 1230–1245 – Thomas of Cantimpré writes Liber de natura rerum, an encyclopedia of natural history
- 1240 – Bartholomeus Anglicus writes De proprietatibus rerum, "On the Properties of Things", a 19-volume encyclopaedia including entries on insects
- 1250 – Vincent of Beauvais Speculum Naturale treats insects, especially bees.
- c. 1250 – The first documented forensic entomology case is reported by Song Ci in the medico-legal text book Xiyuan Jilu. He describes the case of a stabbing near a rice field.
- 1258 – Albertus Magnus treats insects in De animalibus.
- 1350 – Konrad of Megenberg writes Buch der Natur, the first natural history in the German language, with the section "Von den Würmen" covering insects. Written in 1350, Buch der Natur was first printed in moveable type in 1475. NCSU Libraries owns a fragment of the fourth describes insects—both real and imaginary—and reptiles.

== 15th century ==
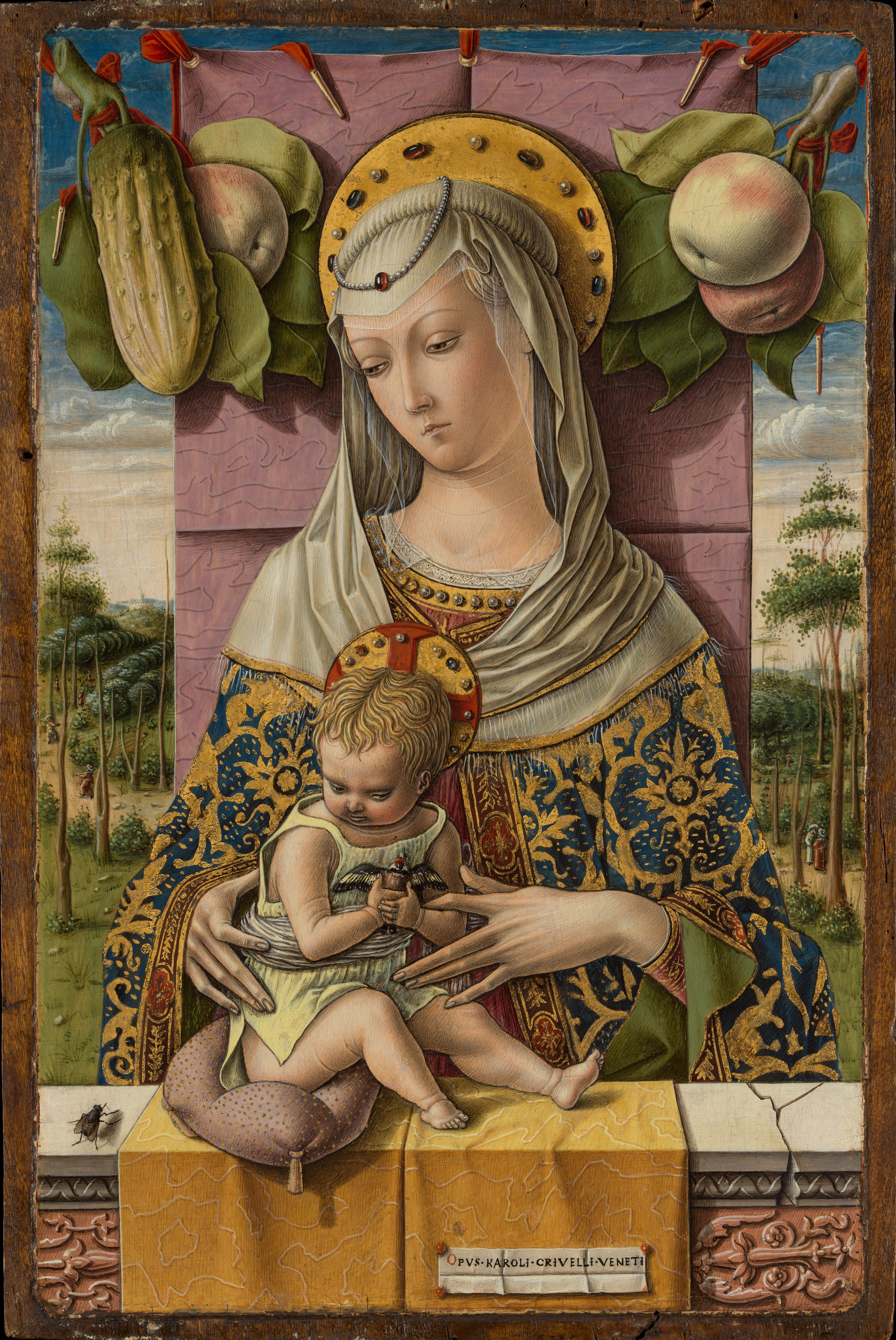
Carlo Crivelli Madonna

- Carlo Crivelli draws an association between flies and death in a painting of the Madonna and Child.

== 16th century ==
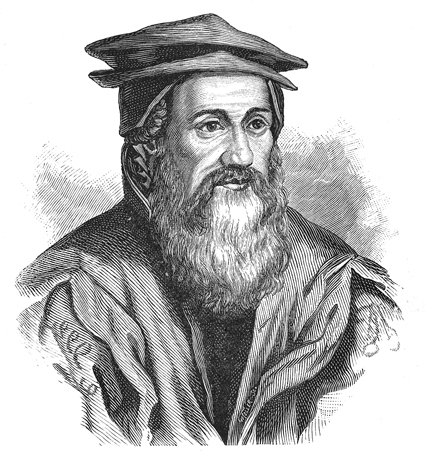
Portrait de Conrad Gessner

Although the earliest pictorial record of a natural history cabinet is the engraving in Ferrante Imperato's Dell'Historia Naturale (Naples 1599), such collections became more than rudimentary early in this century.

- 1503 – The Grandes Heures of Anne of Brittany has accurate marginal illustrations of plants and insects.
- 1505 – Albrecht Dürer paints a stag-beetle.
- 1551 – Zoologist Conrad Gesner publishes the first volume of Historia animalium or History of Animals. The work includes some mention of insects.
- 1556 – Guillaume Rondelet, a professor in Montpellier, publishes De insectis et zoophytis liber.
- 1575 – Joris Hoefnagel begins Animalia Rationalia et Insecta, finished in 1580.
- 1578 – Li Shizhen includes very many insects amongst the 1,000 animals described in Bencao Gangmu.

== 17th century ==
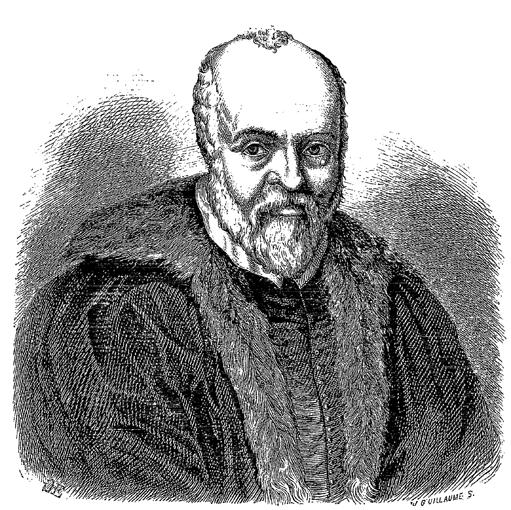
Ulisse Aldrovandi

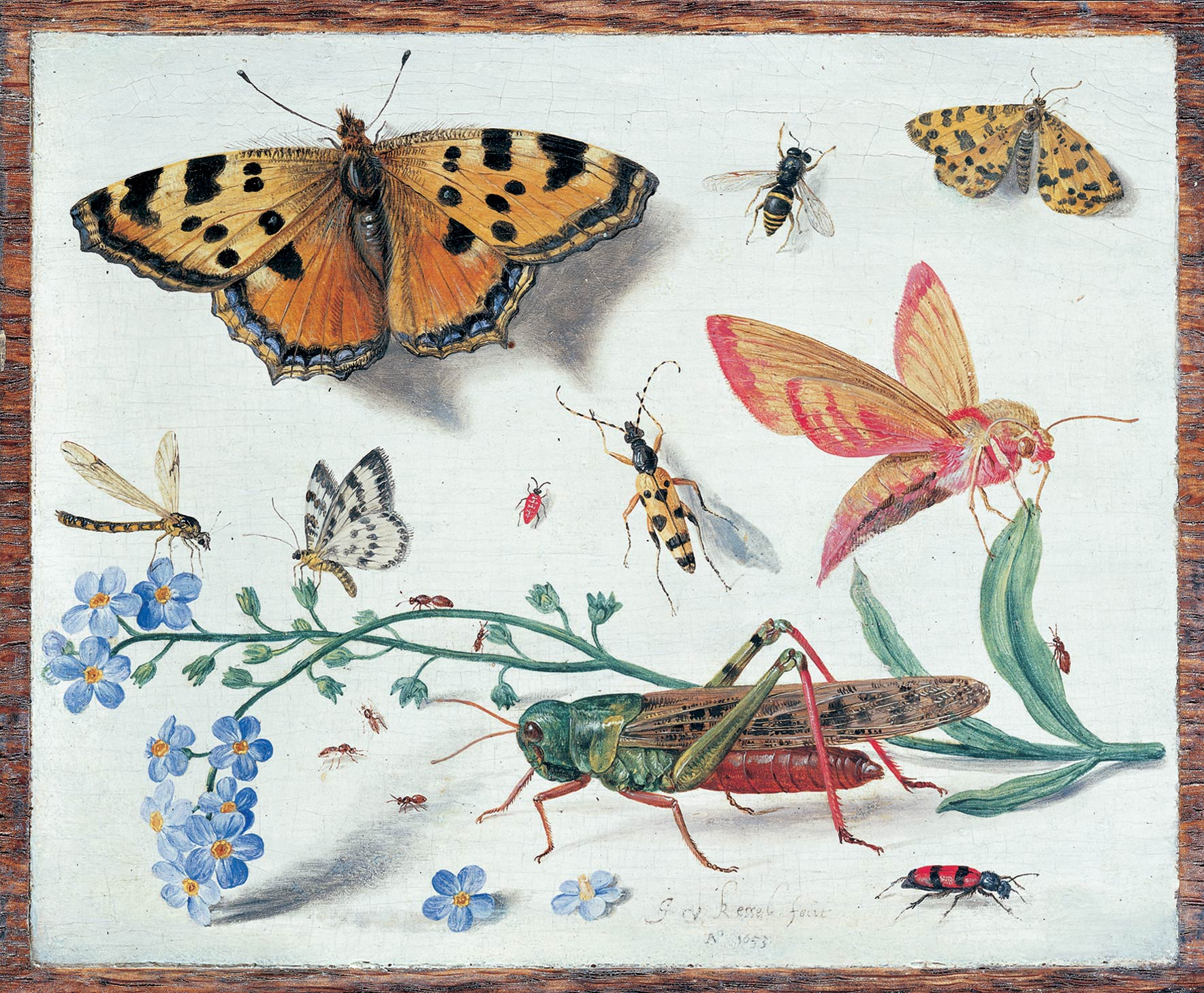
Painting by Jan van Kessel, senior

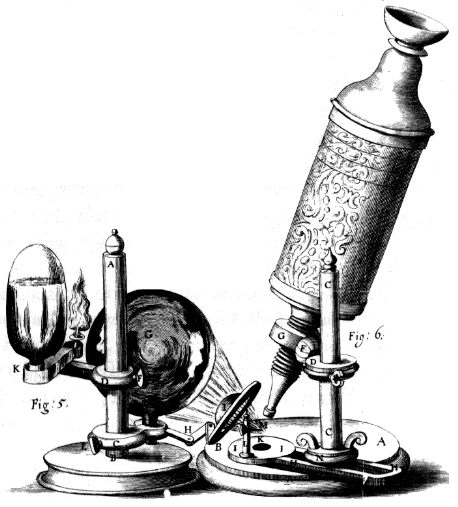
Robert Hooke's microscope

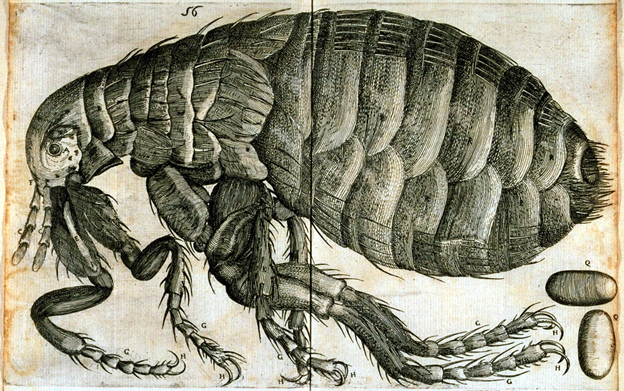
Flea drawn by Buonanni (1691)

- 1602 – Ulisse Aldrovandi's Animalibus insectis libri septem, cum singulorum iconibus AD vivum expressis published. This work was devoted to the insects and some other invertebrates.
- 1609 – The Feminine Monarchie, written by Charles Butler, is published by Joseph Barnes, Oxford, the first full-length English-language book about beekeeping. The title expresses the main idea that the colony is governed, not by a king-bee, as Aristotle claimed, but by a queen-bee.
- 1630 – Jacob Hoefnagel writes Diversae Insectarum Volatium icones ad vivum accuratissimè depictae per celeberrimum pictorem, published in Amsterdam by Nicolao Ioannis Visscher.
- 1634 – Insectorum sive Minimorum Animalium Theatrum, by Thomas Muffet with Edward Wotton, Conrad Gesner and Thomas Penny, is posthumously published, containing the first image of a butterfly from North America, a woodblock print from a painting by John White in 1587.
- 1646 – Wenceslaus Hollar publishes Muscarum scarabeorum in Antwerp.
- 1653 – Joannes Jonstonus's Theatrum Universale Omnium Animalium: Insectorum, Tabulis Viginti Octo ab Illo Celeberrimo Mathia Meriano, Aeri Incisis Ornatum ex Scriptoribus tam Antiquis, Quam Recentioribus is published, a compilation of Konrad Gesner's (1516–1565) and Ulisse Aldrovandi's (1522–1605) natural histories, but with plates engraved by Matthäus Merian.
- 1654 – Eleanor Glanville, notable British entomologist in the field of moths and butterflies, is born.
- 1655 – Samuel Hartlib writes The Reformed Commonwealth of Bees
- Between 1662 and 1667 – Jan Goedart publishes Metamorphosis and historia naturalis, illustrating, by copper plate engravings, the metamorphosis of various insects.
- 1664 – Robert Hooke publishes Micrographia.
- 1668 – Erasmus Finx's Erasmi Francisci Ost- und West- Indischer wie auch Sinesischer Lust- und Stats-garten mit Einem Vorgespräch von Mancherley Lustigen Discursen; in Drey Haupt-theile Unterschieden is published.
- 1669 – Microscopist Jan Swammerdam publishes History of Insects, correctly describing the reproductive organs of insects and metamorphosis. The anatomist Marcello Malpighi publishes a treatise on the structure and development of the silkworm, the first description of the anatomy of an invertebrate.
- 1674 – Johann Daniel Major published Catalogus oder Index Alphabeticus von Kunst, Antiquitäten, Schatz und fürnehmlich Naturalien-Kammern, Conclavia, Musea, Repositoria, oder auch nur kleinere Serinia Rerum Naturalium Selectorum, outlining a collection strategy for museums, and lists collections already extant.
- 1679 – Bohuslav Balbín begins Miscellanea historica regni Bohemiae with Liber naturalis – the Nature of Bohemia which contains notes on insects.
- 1683 – Ole Borch's Dissertationes academicae de poetis is published.
- 1685 – Jan Goedart publishes De Insectis, in methodum redactus, cum notularum additione. Opera M.Lister; item appendicis ad historiam Animalium Angliae. Anton Leeuenhoek publishes Arcana Naturae Detecta.
- 1688 – Steven Blankaart publishes Schou-Burg der Rupsen, Wormen, Maden en Vliegende Dierkens daar uit voortkomende. Door eigen ondervindinge by een gebragt (Showplace of caterpillars, worms, maggots and flying things), published in Amsterdam.
- 1691 – Filippo Bonanni published Observationes circa Viventia, quae in Rebus non-Viventibus
- 1696 – The Royal Society of England publishes the studies of the Italian anatomist Marcaello Malpighi the discoverer of the insect excretory organs known as Malpighian tubules.
- From 1696 to 1700 – Antonio Vallisneri's Dialoghi will sopra the curiosa Origine di molti Insetti, in English, "Dialogues on the curious origin of several insects", is published, in which he, with Francesco Redi and Malpighi, contradict the theory of spontaneous generation of maggots.

== 18th century ==
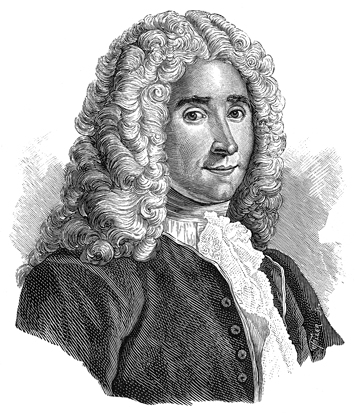
René Antoine Ferchault de Réaumur

The development of entomology in the 18th century

In the 18th century three kinds of entomological text appeared. Firstly there were illustrative works – showy insects often beautifully coloured whose purpose was sensual. An example is afforded by Maria Sybilla Merian's Metamorphosis Insectorum Surinamenis (1705).

Secondly were descriptive and systematic (classificatory) works usually confined to what are now known as the Insecta. Of the second kind Carl Linnaeus' 10th edition of Systema Nature published in 1758 at Stockholm stands proud. In this work the binomial system was finally settled on. Thirdly were works on developmental biology (life cycles), internal anatomy, physiology and so on. These often covered other invertebrate groups. An example is René Antoine Ferchault de Réaumur's Memoires pour Servir a L’Historie des Insectes.

=== 1700–1750 ===
1700

- Prussian Academy of Sciences founded in Berlin.

1702

- James Petiver publishes a celebrated butterfly work Lepidoptera of the Philippine Islands.
- 1702 is also the date of the world's oldest pinned insect specimen; a Bath White butterfly preserved in Oxford University Museum.

1705

- Maria Sybilla Merian Metamorphosis Insectorum Surinamenis (Transformations of the insects of Surinam) published by G. Valck in Amsterdam. It is a masterpiece of both art and science and Maria Merian, "the mother of entomology", was the first to record the full life cycle of many species of butterflies and moths.
- John Ray publishes Methodus Insectorum.

1710

- John Ray publishes Historia insectorum in English, Study of Insects. This is the first attempt at a systematic classification of insect species.
- Francois Xavier Bon de Saint Hilaire writes on the use of spider silk as a textile. This was the first such research.

1715

- 1715 -Levinus Vincent publishes Wondertooneel der Nature the Wonder Theater of Nature

1717

- James Petiver publishes a book on British butterflies entitled Papilionum Brittaniae.

1720

- Eleazar Albin publishes A Natural History of English Insects.
- Charles de Geer born
- Johann Leonhard Frisch 1720-1738 Beschreibung von allerley Insecten in Teutschland Berlin (1720–1738)

1730

- Moses Harris (1730–1788) born in England. Harris was a pioneer of the use of wing venation in insect systematics.

1731

- Mark Catesby publishes part one of The Natural History of Carolina, Florida and the Bahama Islands.

1734

- Scientist René Antoine Ferchault de Réaumur publishes the first Mémoires pour Servir à L’Histoire des Insectes in English, "Memoirs Serving as a Natural History of Insects". This is a founding work of entomology, and one of the most important of all zoological works of the 18th century.

1737

- Microscopist Jan Swammerdam's Biblia naturae or "Book of Nature" is reissued. Describing his studies of insects, it is a founding work of entomology. It is in Latin. Swammerdam's co-authors were Herman Boerhaave and Hieronymus David Gaubius.

1738

- Adolph Modeer born.

1739

- John K'Eogh publishes Zoologica Medicinalis Hibernica, in English, "Zoological Medicine in Ireland".

1740

- Charles Bonnet discovers parthenogenesis by observing that female aphids could reproduce without fertilization.

1745

- Johan Christian Fabricius (1745–1808) is born. Fabricius worked on all insect orders.
- Charles Bonnet published his first work on entomology. Entitled Traité d'insectologie, it collected together his various discoveries regarding insects.

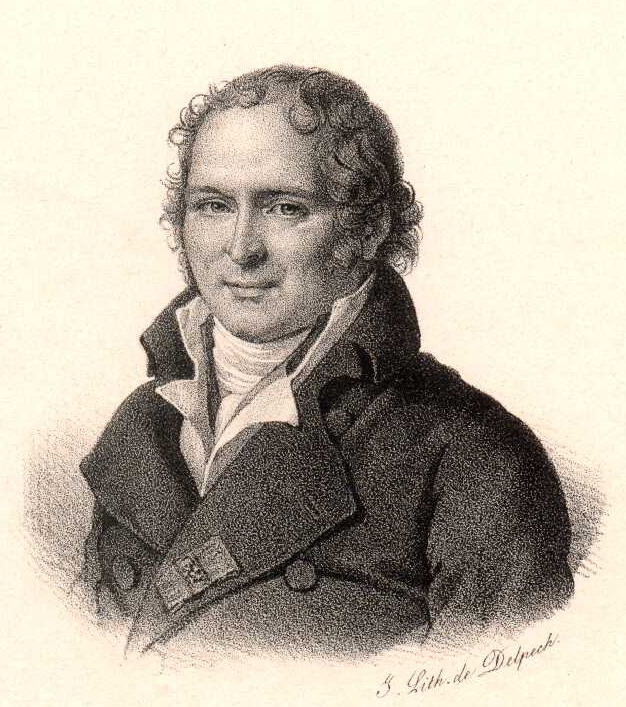
Antoine François, comte de Fourcroy

1746

- August Johann Rösel von Rosenhof publishes Insecten-Belustigung, in English, "Insect Entertainment".

1748

- Georg Dionysus Ehret publishes first part of Plantae et Papiliones Depictae.
- James Dutfield publishes English Moths and Butterflies.

1749

- Benjamin Wilkes publishes English Moths and Butterflies.
- Georges-Louis Leclerc, Comte de Buffon Histoire naturelle, générale et particulière (1749–1788) commenced— 36 volumes and 8 additional volumes published after his death by Bernard Germain Étienne comte de La Ville-sur-Illon La Cépède.Until the publication of this encyclopedia it was thought that all animals were created together by God about 6,000 years ago. Not only did this 44 volume encyclopedia contain all biological knowledge of its time, it offered a different theory. 100 years before Darwin, Buffon claimed that man and ape might have a common ancestor. His work also had significant impact on ecology.

=== 1750–1800 ===
1752

- Maria Theresa of Austria instructs Gerhard van Swieten to establish Vienna as an important centre of natural science. Many entomologists train there.
- Landgravine Caroline Louise of Hesse-Darmstadt founds Staatliches Museum für Naturkunde Karlsruhe

1753

- Louisa Ulrika of Prussia founded the Royal Swedish Academy of Letters, History and Antiquities. Carl Linnaeus named the butterflies in her Drottningens insektsskåp or Drottningen Insect Cabinet

1757

- First volume of Carl Alexander Clerck's Svenska Spindlar published. Describing a number of spiders in binomial nomenclature, it was the first work to employ Linnaeus's binomial system, which had been proposed in his 1753 work Species Plantarum.

1758

- Tenth edition of Carl Linnaeus' Systema Naturae published. World explorers brought back to Europe so many exotic plant and animal specimens that chaos loomed for the 18th-century naturalists attempting to identify, classify, and communicate what they had gathered. Linnaeus made a great contribution to science by developing systems of classification to organize these processes. His principles of organization, especially his system of binomial nomenclature, provided essential tools for entomology. The tenth edition (1758–59), was chosen as the starting point for zoological nomenclature.
- George Edwards Gleanings of Natural history exhibiting figures of Quadrupeds, Birds, Insects, Plants etc. London

1759

- Johann Christian Daniel Schreber Schreberi Novae Species Insectorvm published.

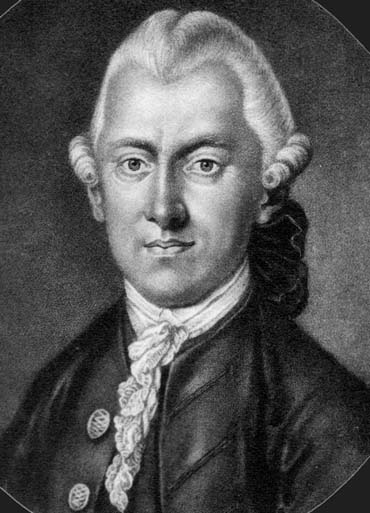
Johann Christian Schreber

1760

- Naturalist and engraver Pieter Lyonnet publishes a monograph on the goat-moth caterpillar, containing details and illustrations of dissections. It is one of the best illustrated books on anatomy ever produced and describes over 4,000 muscles.

1761

- Jacob Hübner (1761–1826) born. Jacob Hübner was the first great world lepidopterist. Before Hübner it was held that there were few genera of Lepidoptera, a view he overthrew. His definitions of genera are among the best of the time and so were his classifications.
- Christiaan Sepp publishes Nederlandische Insecten, in English, "Dutch insects".
- Johann Heinrich Sulzer published Die Kennzeichen der Insekten, nach Anleitung des Königl. Schwed. Ritters und Leibarzts Karl Linnaeus – The characteristics of insects, according to the instructions of Carl Linnaeus.

1762

- Hans Strøm publishes as Physisk og Oeconomisk Beskrivelse over Fogderiet Søndmør I-II in Copenhagen (1762–1766).

1763

- Giovanni Antonio Scopoli publishes Entomologia Carniolica.
- Johann Wilhelm Meigen (1763–1845) born. Meigen began to work on Diptera at the age of twenty five. The first specialist in Diptera Meigen described a vast number of European species and his work on gross taxonomy laid the foundations of the present higher classification of the Order. Unlike his Swedish contemporary Carl Friedrich Fallen he based higher categories on a combination of characters not following Fabricius in using mouthpart characters alone. This new approach was controversial.
- Centuria Insectorum by Carl Linnaeus defended as a thesis by Boas Johansson

1764

- Carl Friedrich Fallen (1764–1830) born. Johan Christian Fabricius attended Linnaeus's lectures on natural classification. He was one of Linnaeus' most important pupils.
- Étienne Louis Geoffroy published Histoire des Insectes.

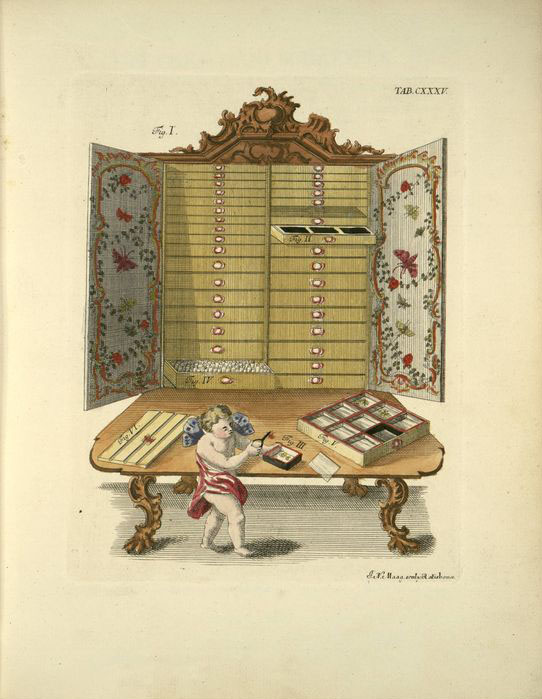
Plate 1 Schaeffer, Jacob Christian (1766) Elementa entomologica

1765

- Johann Eusebius Voet Catalogus Systematicus Coleopterorum published.
- Job Baster Opuscula subseciva, observationes miscellaneae de animalculis et plantis quibusdam eorum ovariis et seminibus continentia. Haarlem

1766

- Moses Harris publishes The Aurelian or Natural History of English Insects, namely Moths and Butterflies. This was the first book on the British Lepidoptera. Harris was a pioneer in using wing venation in insect systematics. A more modern revision did not appear until 1803.

1767

- Voyages of the HM Bark Endeavour under Captain James Cook begin. The extensive insect collections made on the expeditions, the first to Newfoundland, the next to the South Pacific are held in the Natural History Museum in London though a few are to be found in the Natural History Museum, Dublin.

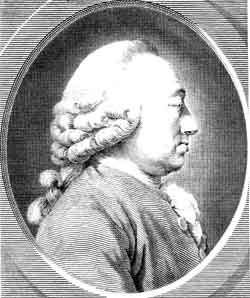
Bonnet

1770

- Johann Reinhold Forster publishes A Catalogue of British Insects at Warrington, England – "This catalogue contains 1000 insects; the Swedes have near 1700, it would therefore be an honour to this country to scrutinize carefully into the various branches of Natural History, and to give the public as perfect and extensive catalogues of British Animals as possible".
- Dru Drury, 1770–1782 Illustrations of natural history, wherein are exhibited figures of exotic insects, a three-volume work commenced at London.
- Christian Rudolph Wilhelm Wiedemann (1770–1840) born. He was a specialist in Diptera (world species).
- 1770s Siegmund Adrian von Rottemburg in part takes over Johann Siegfried Hufnagel's lepidopterological collection.

1771

- Johann Reinhold Forster produces first list of American insects.
- William Curtis publishes Instructions for collecting and preserving insects; particularly moths and butterflies. Illustrated with a copper-plate, on which the nets, and other apparatus necessary for that purpose are delineated…

1772

- Empress Maria Theresa of Austria founds the Académie Impériale et Royale of the Sciences et belles Lettres de Bruxelles in Belgium. It becomes a centre for Low Countries entomology.
- Christoph Friedrich Richter publishes Lehrbuch einer Naturhistorie zu einem gemeinnützigen Gebrauche

1773

- Gesellschaft Naturforschender Freunde zu Berlin founded.

1774

- Der Naturforscher (transl. "The Naturalist") commenced then published yearly to 1804
- John Coakley Lettsome The naturalist's and traveler's companion, containing instructions for collecting and preserving objects of natural history and for promoting inquiries after human knowledge in general, London: E. and C. Dilly (1774): a much used work on collecting.
- Johann Bernhard Basedow publishes Elementarwerk, in English "Elementary Book" which includes sections on natural history and insects.

1775

- First part of Pieter Cramer's 1775–82 De Uitlandische Kapellen (Papillons Exotiques de Trois Partes de Monde published.
- Johan Christian Fabricius' Systema entomologica published.

1776

- Otto Friedrich Müller published Zoologiae Danicae Prodromus.
- Peter Brown published New illustrations of Zoology

1777

- Johann Ludwig Christian Gravenhorst (1777–1857). Gravenhorst worked mainly on Ichneumonidae.
- Eugenius Johann Christoph Esper Europaischen Schmetterlinge commenced publication.

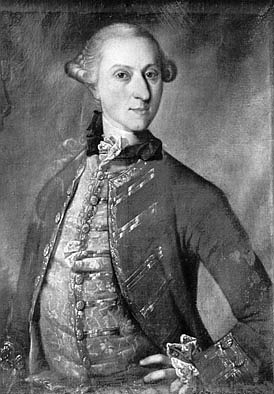
Eugen Johann Christoph Esper

1778

- Pierre-Justin-Marie Macquart (1778–1855) born. Macquart worked mainly on Diptera describing many world species.

1779

- Jacob Christian Schäffer Icones insectorum circa ratisbonam indigenorum coloribus naturam referentibus expressae published.
- 1779–1780 Johann Friedrich Blumenbach Handbuch der Naturgeschichte. 12 editions and some translations. Published first in Göttingen by J. C. Dieterich

1780

- The Society of Entomologists of London formed (short-lived).
- Caspar Stoll's Natuurlyke en naar 't leeven naauwkeurig gekleurde Afbeeldingen en Beschryvingen der Cicaden en Wantzen, in alle vier Waerelds Deelen Europa, Asia, Africa en America huishoudende, by een verzameld en beschreeven published.
- Pierre Françoise Marie Auguste Dejean (1780–1845) born.

1781

- Franz von Paula Schrank Enumeratio insectorum Austriae indigenorum published at Vienna.
- August Wilhelm Knoch publishes Beyträge zur Insektengeschichte in Leipzig. Three volumes 1781, 1782, 1783.
- James Barbut publishes The genera insectorum of Linnæus exemplified in various specimens of English insects drawn from nature.

1782

- Encyclopédie Méthodique commenced. Its popularity and ubiquity later ensuring the entomological tableau which appeared from 1817 onwards had a wide audience.
- Clas Bjerkander Insect-Calender, för år 1781. Kongliga Vetenskaps Academiens Nya Handlingar 3 (4–6): 122–132. Stockholm.
- Heinrich Gottlob Lang First edition of Verzeichniss seiner Schmetterlinge, in den Gegenden um Augsburg published by Maria Jakobina Klett in Augsburg.

1783

- Andreas Johann Retzius publishes Genera et species insectorum.
- Johan Adam Pollich Descriptio insectorum Palatinorum. Act. Leopoldina VII.
- Johann August Ephraim Goeze Entomologische Beyträge zu des Ritter Linné zwölften Ausgabe des Natursystems published in Leipzig.

1777

- Papillons d'Europe, peints d'après nature par M. Ernst. et Engramelle, M.D.J. commenced -completed 1785
- Publication, in Berlin, of Carl Gustav Jablonsky and Johann Friedrich Wilhelm Herbst Natursystem aller bekannten in- und ausländischen Insecten, als eine Fortzetsung der von Büffonschen Naturgeschichte. Nach dem System des Ritters Carl von Linné bearbeitet or, in English, "Natural system of all well-known in [Europe] and foreign Insects, as a continuation of Buffon's natural history. After the system of the honoured master, Carl von Linné". This is a superbly illustrated work on world and European Coleoptera. Jablonsky was private secretary to the Queen of Prussia.
- Johann Wilhelm Zetterstedt (1785–1874) born. Zetterstedt worked mainly on Diptera.
- Antoine François, comte de Fourcroy Entomologia Parisiensis, sive, Catalogus insectorum quae in agro Parisiensi reperiuntur ..., co-written with Étienne Louis Geoffroy, published in this year, was a major contribution to systematic entomology.

1786

- Johann Nepomuk von Laicharting Verzeichniss und Beschreibung der Tyroler-Insecten. Lists and descriptions of Tirol insects.
- Ernst Friedrich Germar born.

1787

- Thomas Say (1787–1834) born.

1788

- Linnean Society of London founded. The Society published many important works on insects.
- Caspar Stoll Representation des Spectres ou Phasmes, des Mantes...Sauterelles des Grillons et des Blattes published. This work contains beautiful plates of praying mantis species.
- Guillaume-Antoine Olivier Entomologie ou Histoire Naturelle des Insectes, avec leurs Caracteres Generiques et Specifiques, leur Description, leur Synonomie et leur Figure Illuminee. Coleopteres. commenced publication in Paris. The first volumes preceded Latreille's in time and the system used was a combination of Linne and Fabricius.
- Johann Wilhelm Meigen commences study of Diptera.
- Naturhistorieselskabet founded in Denmark
- Johann Jacob Roemer Genera Insectorum Linnaei et Fabricii, Iconibus Illustrata published.
- Carl Peter Thunberg Dissertatio Entomologica Novas Insectorum species sistens, cujus partem quintam. Publico examini subjicit Johannes Olai Noraeus, Uplandus. Upsaliae published.
- Johann Kaspar Füssli Neue Magazin für Liebhaber der Entomologie (last part 1786).
- Charles Joseph Devillers publishes Caroli Linnaei entomologia

1789.

- August Batsch Versuch einer Anleitung, zur Kenntniß und Geschichte der Thiere und Mineralien, für akademische Vorlesungen entworfen, und mit den nöthigsten Abbildungen versehen. Zweyter Theil. Besondre Geschichte der Insekten, Gewürme und Mineralien, in English Provisional guide to the knowledge, development and history of the animals and minerals, designed for academic lectures Part 2 The particular history of insects, on worms, and minerals.

1790

- Jan Daniel Preysler publishes Verzeichnis böhmischen Insekten in Prague.

1791

- John Curtis (1791–1862) born.
- Johann Ludwig Christ publishes Naturgeschichte, Klassifikation und Nomenklatur der Insekten vom Bienen, Wespen und Ameisengeschlecht.
- David Heinrich Schneider begins publication of Neues Magazin für Liebenhaber der Entomologie. Stralsund

1792

- The Dublin Society purchases the natural history collection of Nathaniel Gottfried Leske containing 2,500 species of insects from Europe and the "rest of the World". The sale catalogue was titled Museum Leskeanum. Pars entomologica ad systema entomologiae. CL. Fabreicii ordinata etc.. Leske was from Leipzig and the collection contained (s) Johan Christian Fabricius’ and Johann Friedrich Gmelin's types as well as his own.
- Edward Donovan The Natural history of British Insects commenced publication in London.
- Josef Aloys Frölich, Bemerkungen über einige seltene Käfer aus der Insektensammlung des Herrn Hofr. und Prof. Rudolph in Erlangen. Der Naturforscher 26: 68–165, Halle.

1793

- Georg Wolfgang Franz Panzer Faunae Insectorum Germanicae Initia oder Deutschlands published.
- William Dandridge Peck "The Description and History of the Canker Worm" Mass. Mag. Vol.7. Peck was the first Native American entomologist.
- Carl Ulisses von Salis-Marschlins Reisen in verscheidene Provinzen des Königreichs Neapel published in Zürich und Leipzig.
- Leonardo De Prunner Catalogus larvarum Europae
- Christian Konrad Sprengel Das entdeckte Geheimnis der Natur im Bau und in der Befruchtung der Blumen published in Berlin. A classic work on pollination.

1796

- Gustav von Paykull's Fauna Suecica and Johann Karl Wilhelm Illiger's Kugelann Verzeichniss der Kafer Prussens commenced publication. Illiger's work was a summary of Paykull's revisions of Swedish beetles.
- Carl Henrik Boheman (1796–1868) born in Jönköping, Sweden. Boheman worked mainly on Coleoptera, especially Chrysomelidae and Rhynchophora.

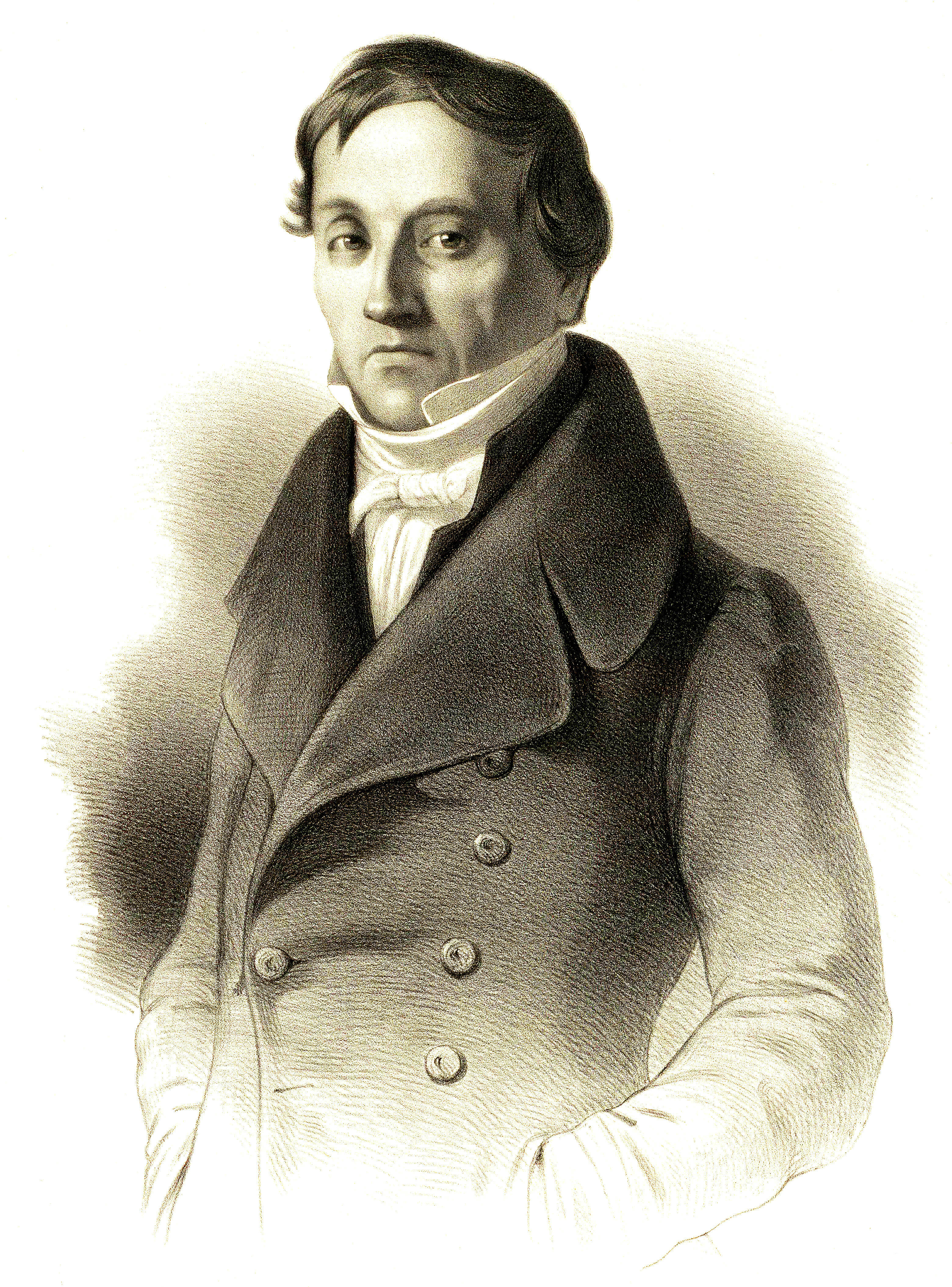
Karl Ernst von Baer

1797

- John Abbot and James Edward Smith The Natural History of the Rarer Lepidoptera of Georgia. A masterwork with than 100 beautifully coloured plates.
- Pierre André Latreille. Precis des Caracteres Generiques des Insectes disposes dans un Ordre Naturel published. It proposed “ Natural classes and genera are based not only on the mouthparts, the wings or the antennae, but on careful observation of the entire structure, even of the smallest differences".
- Jean Victoire Audouin (1797–1841) born.

1798

- Edward Donovan An Epitome of the Natural History of the Insects of China published in London. It is a famed work of entomological art.
- Joseph Phillipe de Clairville Helvetische Entomologie published in Zürich.
- Andre Jean Baptiste Robineau-Desvoidy (1799–1857) born in France. Robineau-Desvoidy worked mainly on Diptera.
- Charles Nodier Dissertation sur l'usage des antennes dans les insectes, Paris.

1799

- Jean Baptiste Alphonse De Chauffour de Boisduval (1799–1879) born. This eminent lepidopterist was one of the original members of the Société Entomologique de France. He wrote fifty publications mainly on Lepidoptera but also on Coleoptera and Homoptera. He described the Lepidoptera taken on the voyages of L'Astrolabe and La Coquille.
- Jean Antoine Coquebert de Montbret Illustratio iconographica insectorum quae in musaeis parisinis. Paris: P. Didot, commenced (finished in 1804).

== See also ==
- Timeline of entomology – for a list of other available time periods
- List of entomologists
- Science in the Age of Enlightenment
