= Barbut =

Barbut is a surname, and may refer to:

- Cristian Bărbuț (born 1995), Romanian footballer
- James Barbut (fl. 1776–1791), English painter and naturalist
- Monique Barbut (born 1956), French public servant

== See also ==
- Barbute, a visorless war helmet
