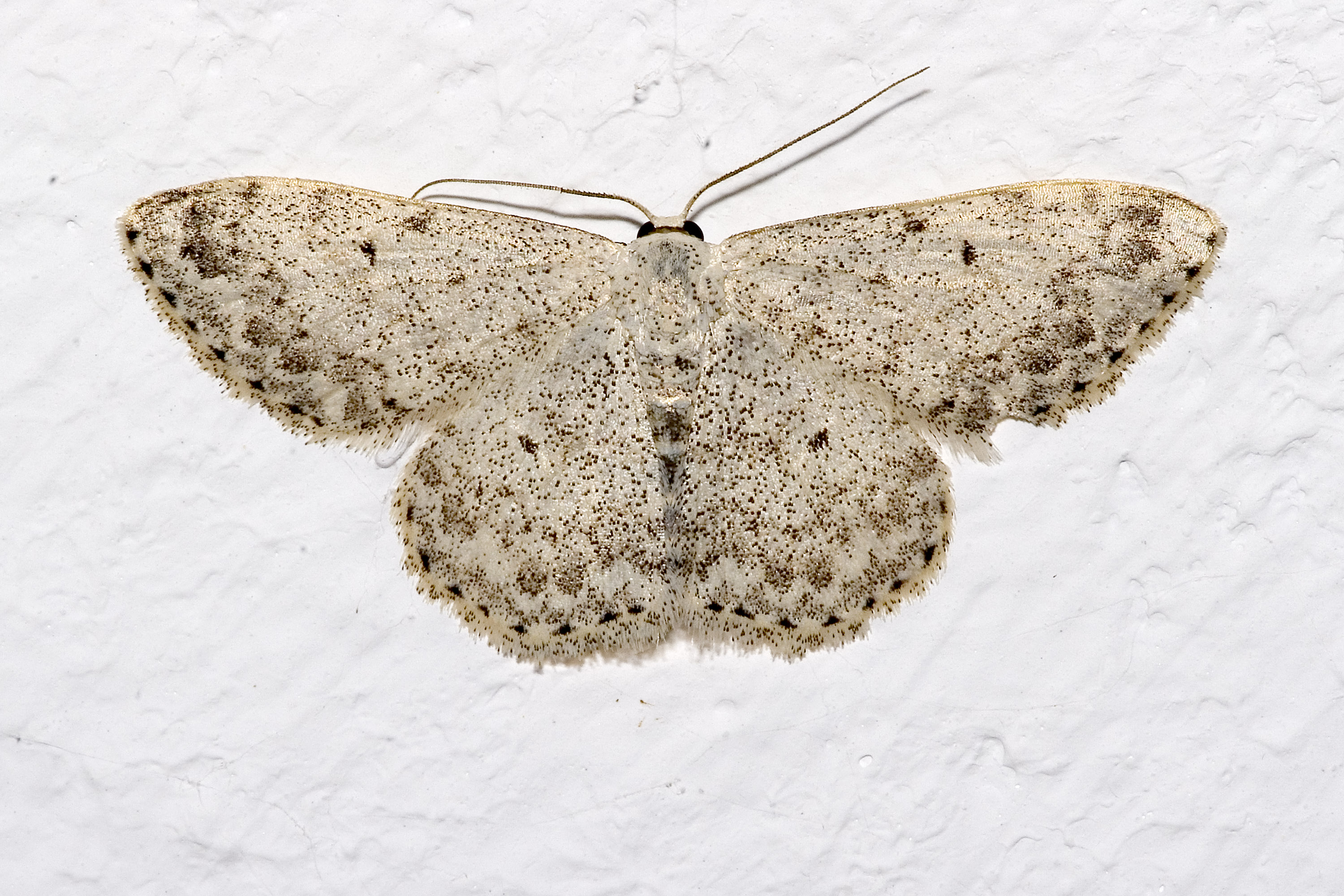

Scientific classification
- Domain: Eukaryota
- Kingdom: Animalia
- Phylum: Arthropoda
- Class: Insecta
- Order: Lepidoptera
- Family: Geometridae
- Genus: Scopula
- Species: S. marginepunctata

Binomial name
- Scopula marginepunctata (Goeze, 1781)

Synonyms
- Phalaena marginepunctata Goeze, 1781; Phalaena aniculosata Rambur, 1829; Acidalia apertaria Walker, 1863; Phalaena conjugata Borkhausen, 1794; Phalaena coniugata; Acidalia marginepunctata griseofasciata Turati, 1915; Acidalia marginepunctata madoniata Fuchs, 1901; Acidalia pastoraria de Joannis, 1891; Acidalia subatrata Wagner, 1919; Scopula terrigena Prout, 1935

= Scopula marginepunctata =

Mullein wave

Species of geometer moth in subfamily Sterrhinae

Scopula marginepunctata, the mullein wave, is a moth of the family Geometridae. It was described by Johann August Ephraim Goeze in 1781. It is found throughout Europe.

== Distribution ==
Scopula marginepunctata occurs in Europe from the Iberian Peninsula in the west to the Ural mountains in the east. In the north, the range extends to the south coast of England, the southern Netherlands and the German Baltic Sea coast. However the species is missing in parts of northern Germany. There are isolated occurrences on Bornholm, Skåne and the southern Baltic. In the south, the range extends in North Africa from Morocco in the west to Egypt. The distribution ranges from there further over the Middle East, Asia minor, the Caucasus, northern Iran, Central Asia and Mongolia.

== Description ==
The wingspan is 25–28 millimetres (0.98–1.10 in). The length of the forewings is 12–15 millimetres (0.47–0.59 in). The second generation is often smaller and the moths reach only about 18 mm wingspan. Colour and wing pattern vary. The base colour is off-white to light brown, and the wings are strong dark over dusted with dark scales. In the Swiss Canton of Ticino darkened forms occur, which were formerly called subspecies insubrica. The pattern of the wing is dark grey to dark brown, depending on the ground colour. The interior cross line and median bands are usually little developed. The medium band is relatively wide, if present, but frequently washed out. The interior cross line is often reduced to a row of dots. Usually only the outer cross line is significantly developed and almost always very pronounced and jagged, the tips of the spikes are even darker highlighted towards the marginal field. The front edge itself may be slightly darker than the ground colour. In the marginal field, usually four to five tooth-shaped, slurred stains are present, two penultimate often characteristic close. The intensity of each cross line may be slightly different on forewings and hindwings. Marginal stains are usually present. Discal flecks are almost always present on the front as well as on the rear wings.

In North Africa the subspecies Scopula marginepunctata argillacea replaces the nominate. It is light brown with relatively weak pattern.

In the north of Iran, Central Asia and Mongolia, the subspecies Scopula marginepunctata terrigena occurs. It is slightly larger than the nominate with a 29 millimetres (1.1 in) wingspan. The marginal field and medium fields are wide and slightly dark brown in colour.

The egg is elongated oval and flattened at the top. It is initially coloured light yellow, just before hatching it turns stained red. The outside shows strong longitudinal ribs that intersect with slightly weaker cross ribs. The caterpillar is relatively long and slender and gets slightly thinner forward. The segments are clearly constricted. It is grey-yellow to grey-brown coloured with a dark dorsal line. The dorsal line is accompanied by black dots. The abdominal side is slightly darker, the spiracles are coloured black. The pupa is light brown coloured with slightly greenish wing sheaths. The head and posterior end are a little darker. The segments are relatively deep, the cremaster is relatively short and studded with bristles.

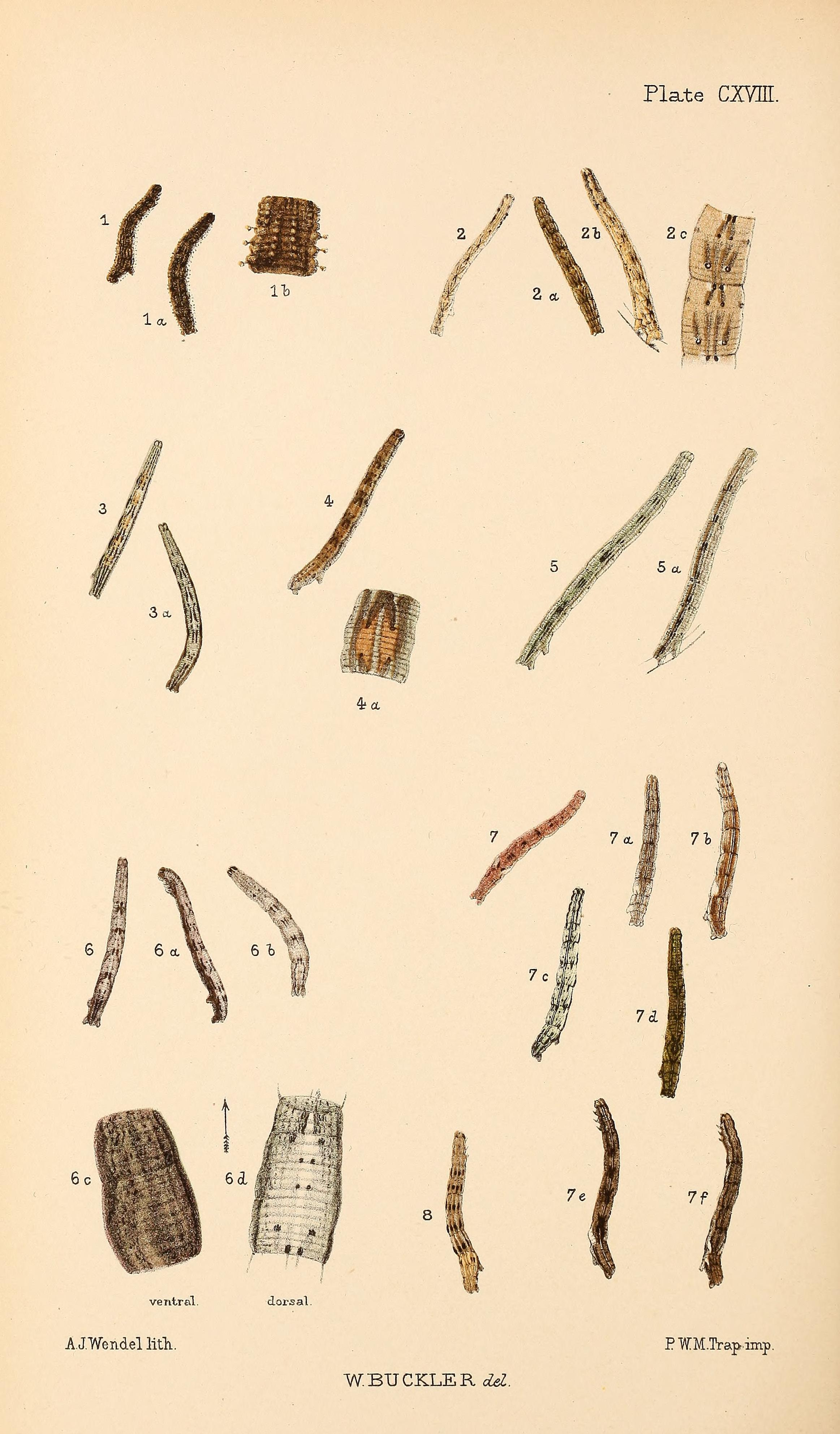
Larvae after final moult (figs.5, 5a)

== Biology ==
The moth flies in two generations from mid-May to September and the larva feeds on yarrow and mugwort.

== Subspecies ==
- Scopula marginepunctata marginepunctata
- Scopula marginepunctata subatrata (Wagner, 1919)
- Scopula marginepunctata terrigena Prout, 1935
