= Johann Stephan Capieux =

German illustrator (1748–1813)

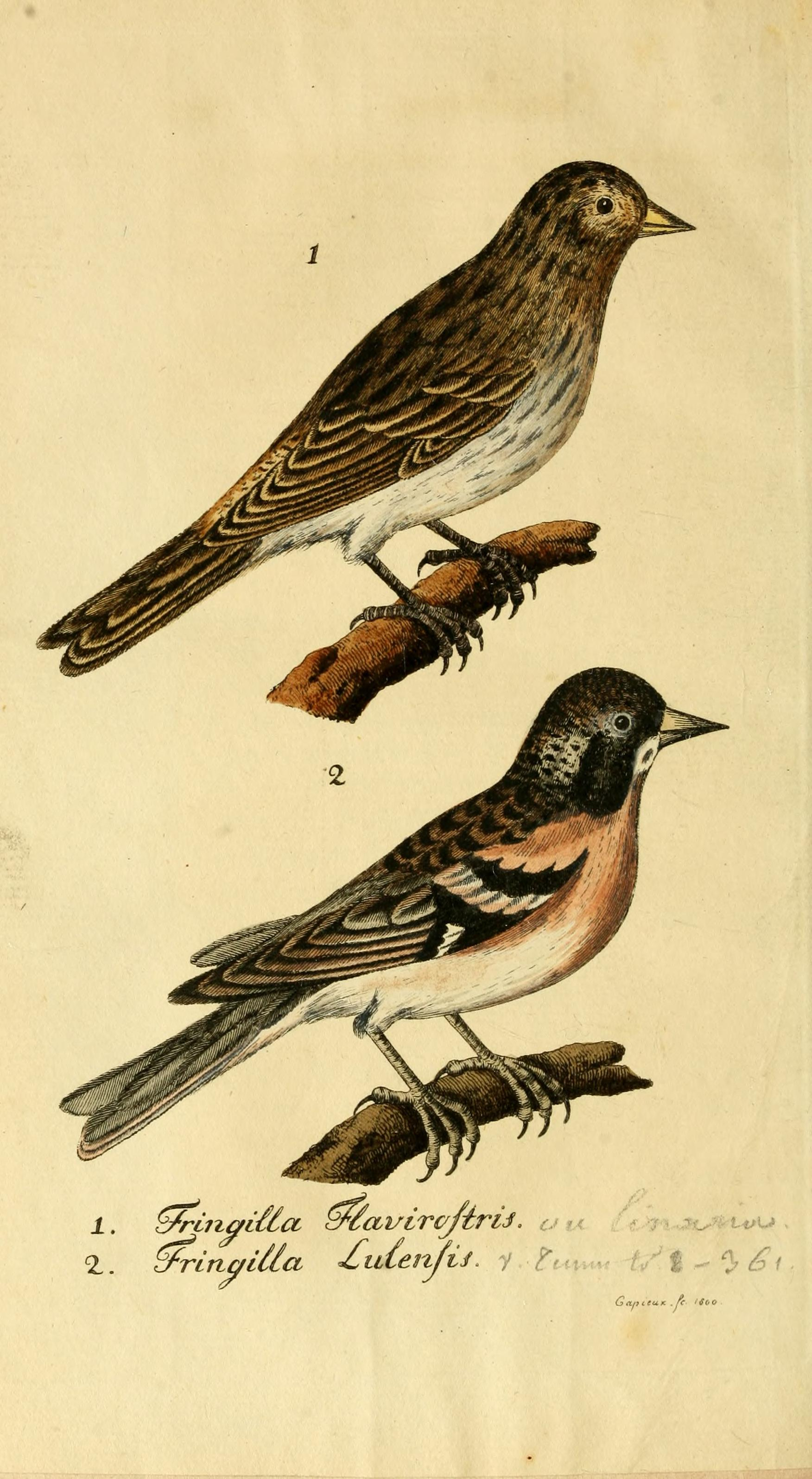
Fringilla in Faunae Suecicae Leipzig, 1800

Johann Stephan Capieux (January 8, 1748 in Schwedt – June 8, 1813 in Leipzig) was a German illustrator of Huguenot origin. He received his artistic training at the Leipzig Art Academy under Adam Friedrich Oeser. Capieux provided illustrations for

- Der Naturforscher
- Johann Samuel Schröter Abhandlungen über verschiedene Gegenstände der Naturgeschichte. Halle 1776 doi:10.5962/bhl.title.36902
- Peter Artedi and Johann Gottlob Schneider, 1750-1822 Synonymia piscium Graeca et Latina emendata, aucta atque illustrata. Leipzig 1789 doi:10.5962/bhl.title.5790
- Christian Konrad Sprengel Das entdeckte Geheimniss der Natur im Bau und in der Befruchtung der Blumen. Berlin 1793 doi:10.5962/bhl.title.61000
- Carl von Linné revised and expanded by Anders Jahan Retzius Faunae suecicae a Carolo à Linné equ. inchoatae pars prima. Leipzig, Siegfried Lebrecht Crusius 1800-1809 doi:10.5962/bhl.title.43961
- Johann Matthäus Bechstein, Gemeinnützige Naturgeschichte Deutschlands nach allen drey Reichen ein Handbuch zur deutlichern und vollständigern Selbstbelehrung besonders für Forstmänner, Jugendlehrer und Oekonomen . Leipzig 1801–1809 doi:10.5962/bhl.title.43818
- August Johann Georg Karl Batsch Elenchus fungorum. Halae Magdeburgicae : Apud Joannem Jacobum Gebauer [1783-1789]
- Johann Christian von Loder Tabulae anatomicae quas ad : Vimariae Sumtibus novi Bibliopolii Vulgo Industrie-Comptoir dicti, 1803.
- Abraham Gottlob Werner Handbuch Mineral (1803)
- Alexander von Humboldt Flora Fribergensis (1793) online at BHL
- Christian Friedrich Ludwig Icones cavitatum thoracis (1789)
- Paulus Christian Fredrich Werner 1782. Vermium intestinalium brevis exposition continuatio. 28 pp. Lipsiae.
- Karl Ludwig Willdenow Grundriss Der Krauterkunde Berlin, 1810
- Caroli Godofredi Hagen Tentamen historiae lichenum et praesertim prussicorum
- Ignaz von Born and Friedrich Wilhelm Heinrich von Trebra Bergbaukunde Georg Joachim Göschen (1789–90)
- Georg Franz Hoffmann Descriptio Et Adumbratio Plantarum E Classe Cryptogamica Linnaei quae Lichenes dicuntur Lipsiae Crusius 1794
- Johann Ernst Fabri Neues geographisches Lesebuch, zum Nutzen und Vergnügen. Erstes Bändchen (= alles Erschienene). Leipzig: August Leberecht Reinicke, 1791

Gallery

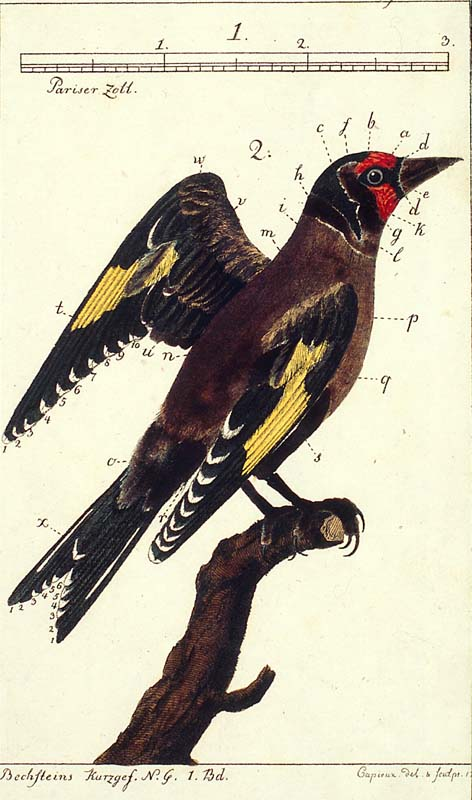
Bird morphology in Bechstein, J. Naturgeschichte des In- und Auslandes für Schulen

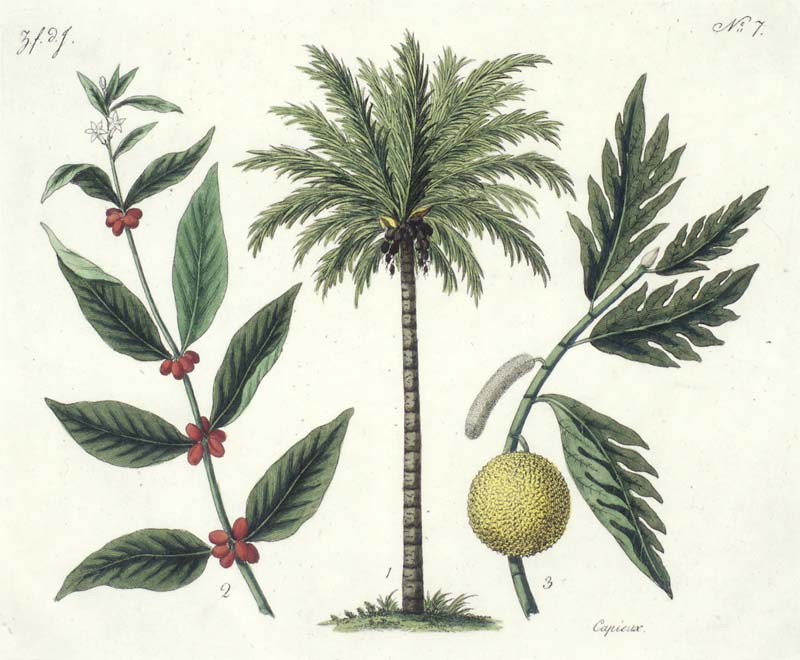
Der Brotbaum, die Kokospalme und die Kaffeepflanze In: Bildungsblätter oder Zeitung für die Jugend scans Heidelberg University Library

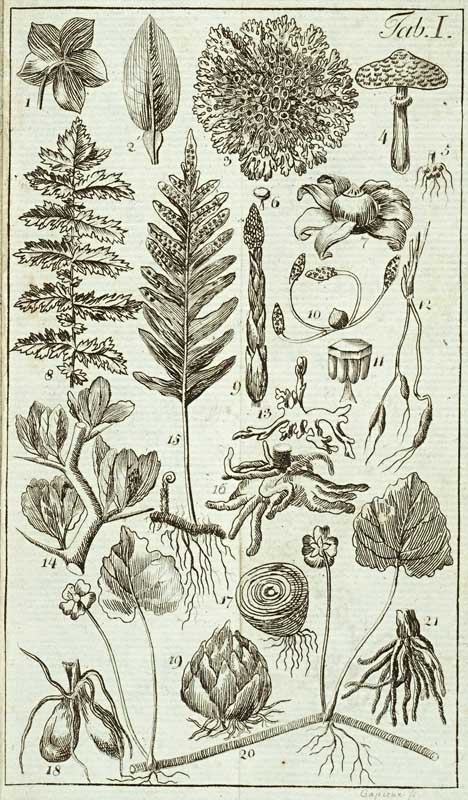
Plate from Grundriss Der Krauterkunde by Karl Ludwig Willdenow Berlin, 1810

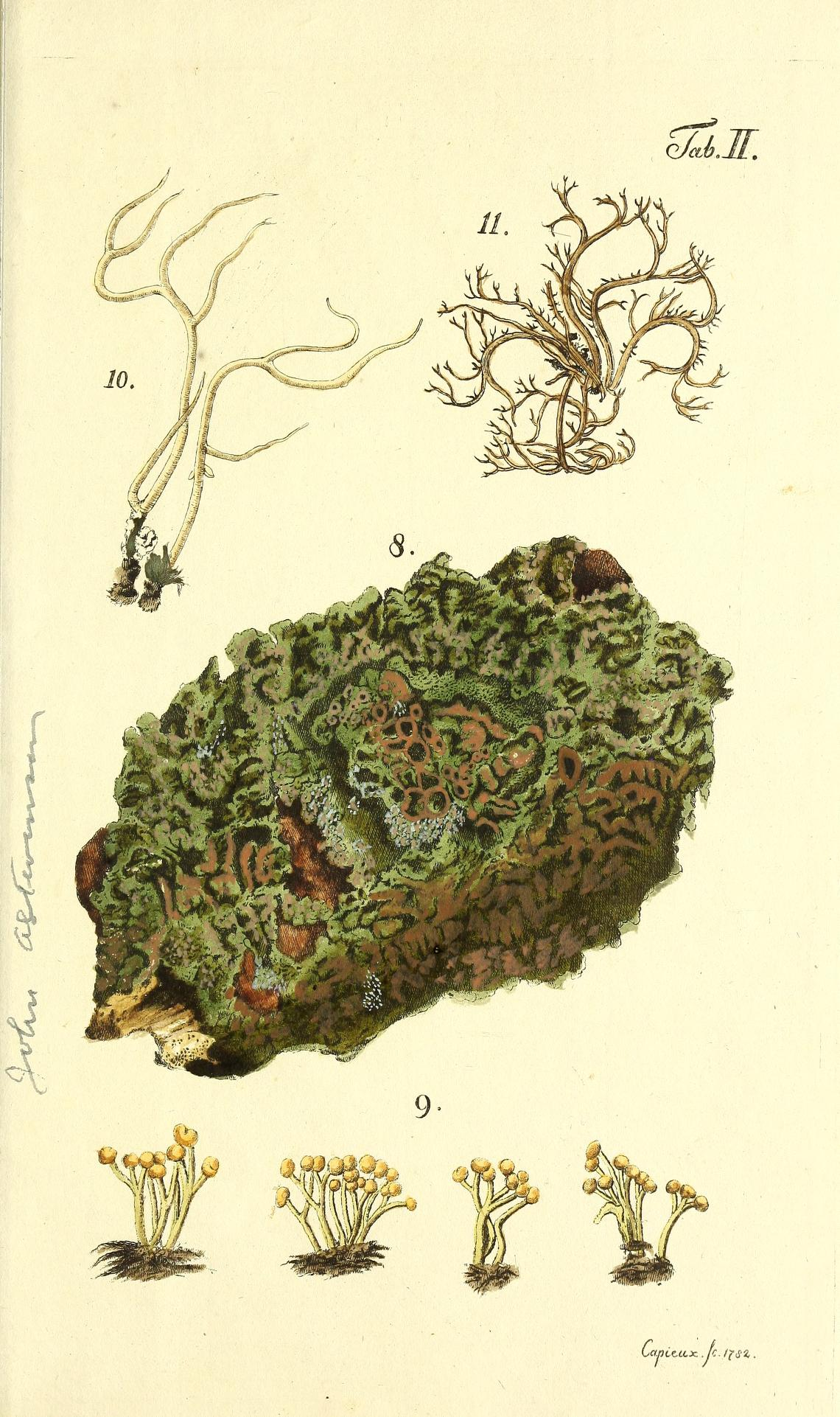
Plate from Caroli Godofredi Hagen Tentamen historiae lichenum et praesertim prussicorum Lichens

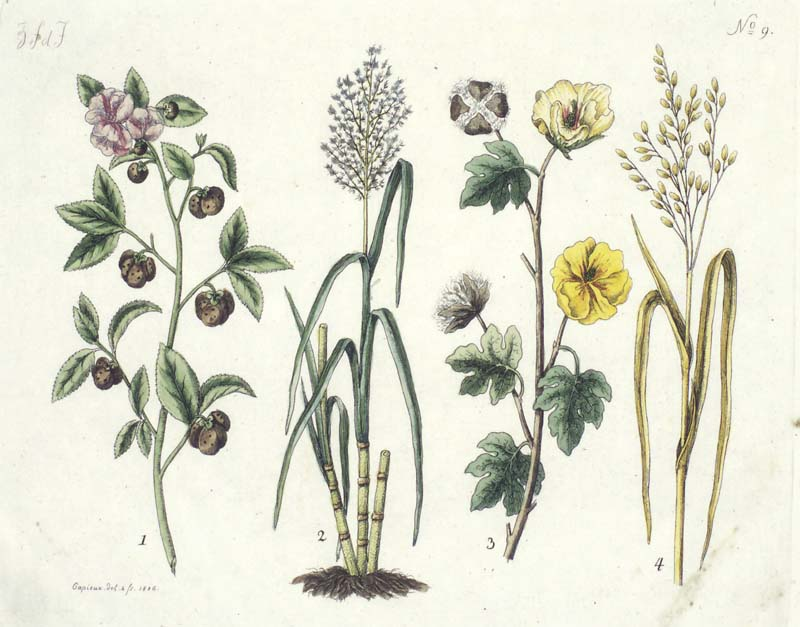
Die Abbildungen von vier sehr nützlichen Pflanzen In: Bildungsblätter oder Zeitung für die Jugendscans Heidelberg University Library Original.

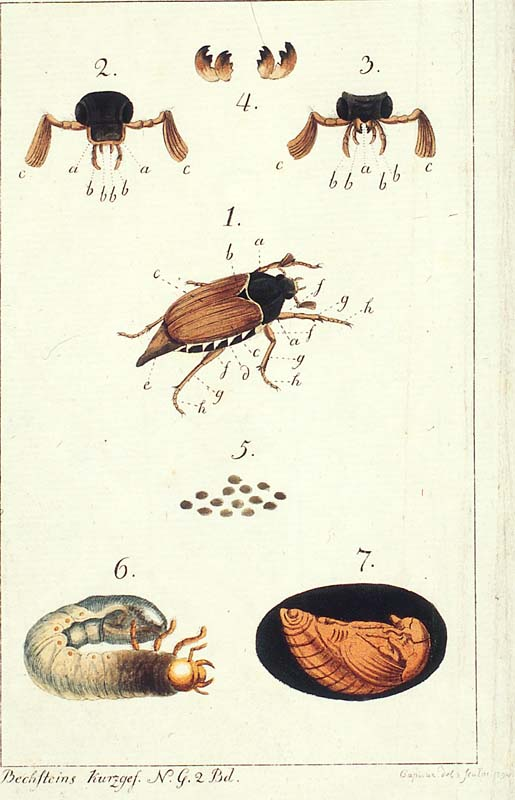
Der Maikäfer (Kreuzkäfer) In: Bechstein, J. Fische, Insecten und Würmer. Original.

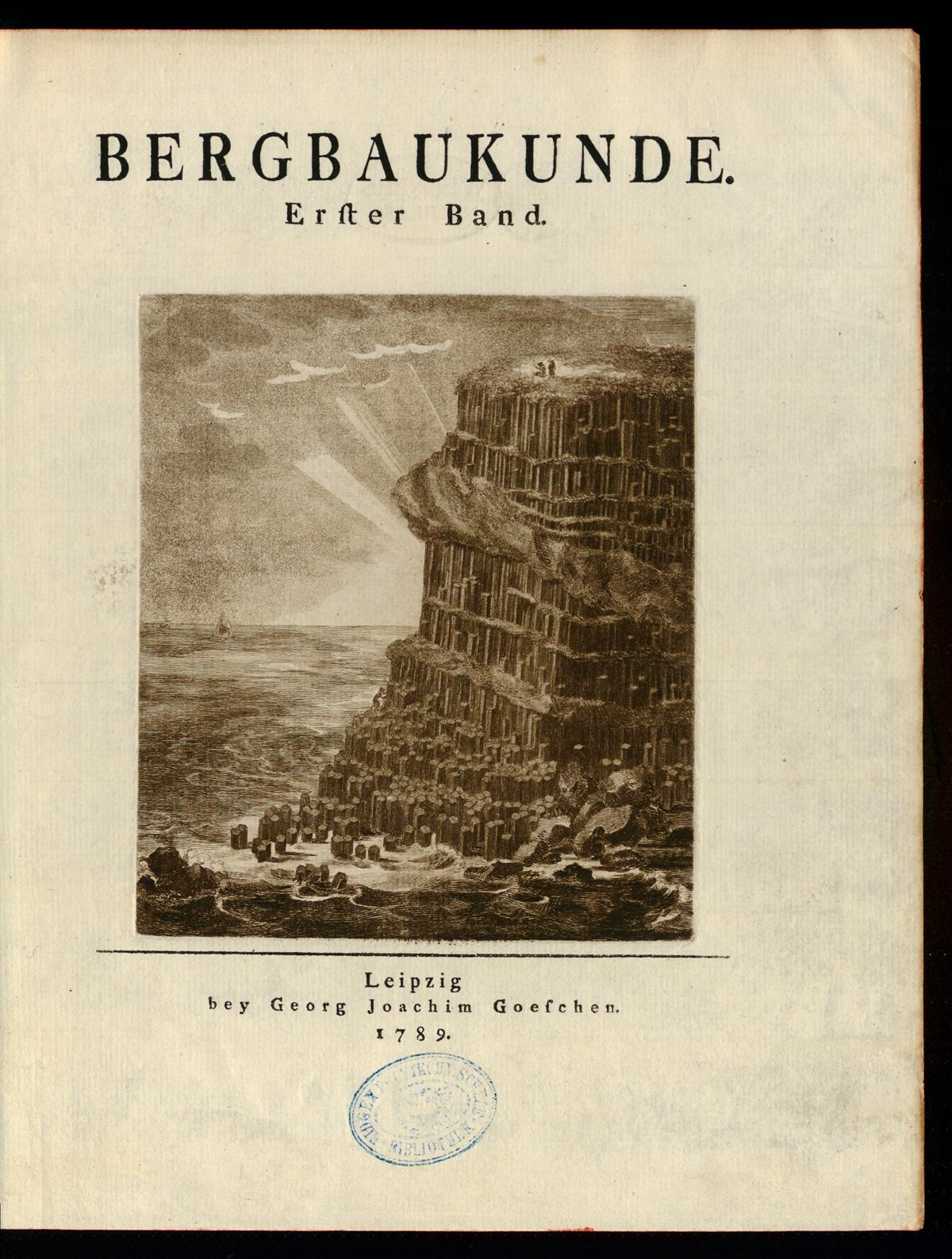
von Born and von Trebra Bergbaukunde (1789–90)

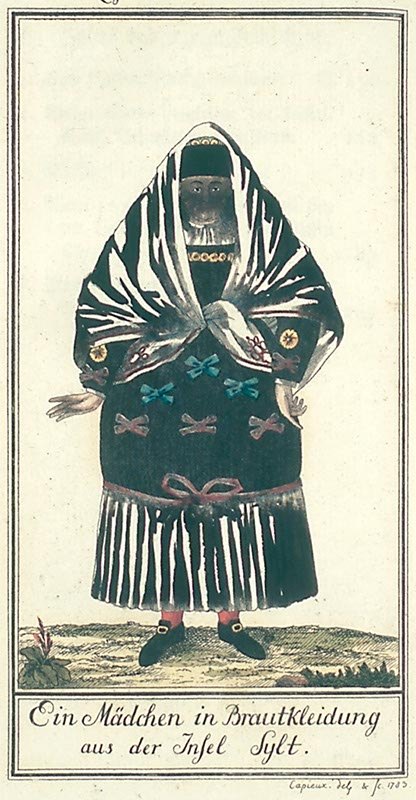
Johann Ernst Fabri Neues geographisches Lesebuch, 1791
