= Der Naturforscher =

German scientific publication of the Enlightenment

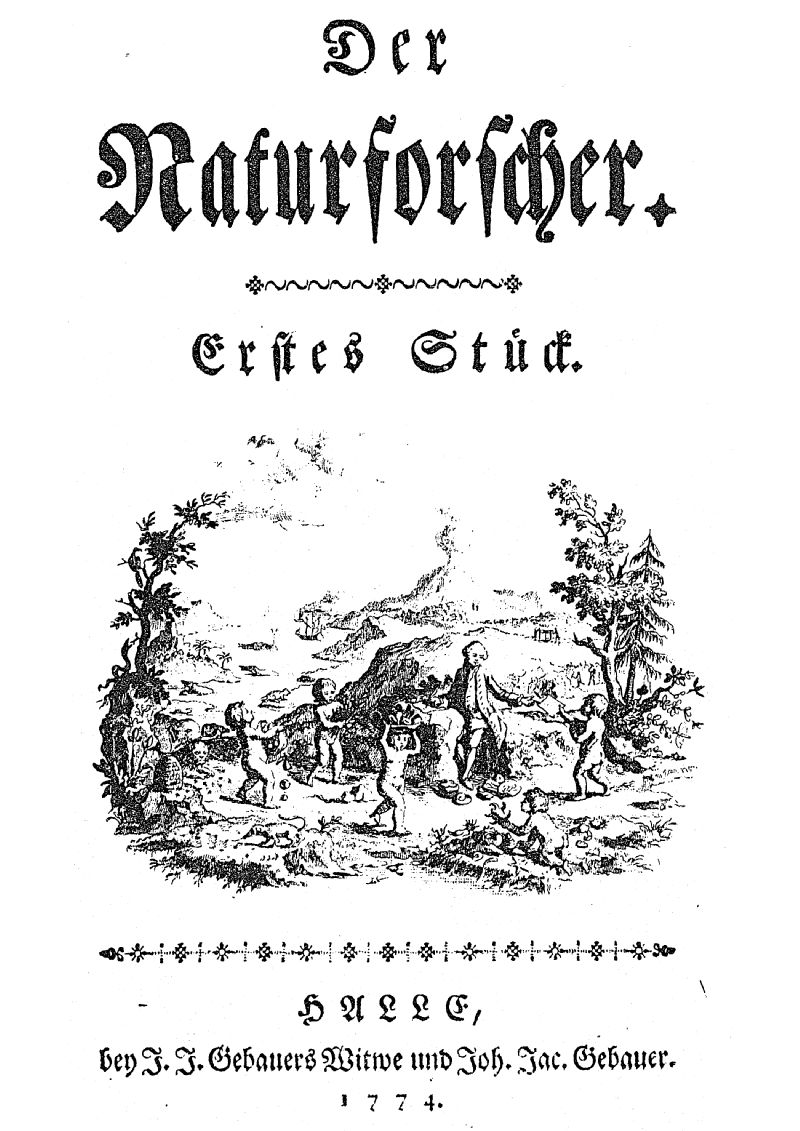
Der Naturforscher Title page

Der Naturforscher (transl. "The Naturalist") was a German scientific publication of the Enlightenment devoted to natural history. It was published yearly from 1774 to 1804, by J. J. Gebauers Witwe and Joh. Jac. Gebauer at Halle and edited first by Johann Ernst Immanuel Walch (from 1774 to 1778) and later by Johann Christian Daniel von Schreber (from 1779 to 1802). Both editors were also contributors. Most of the articles concern aspects of invertebrate zoology, mostly entomology and conchology. A few concern ornithology and other subjects, including mineralogy.

It is usually bound in fifteen volumes octavo. Indices and registers are given at ten year intervals enumerating 640 memoirs. Just over 150 plates accompany the text. Many of the illustrations are by Johann Stephan Capieux and are of a very high standard. Armin Geus provides comprehensive indices.

== Contributors ==
Most authors contributing to Der Naturforscher were German, but the journal also included some French authors. No natural history journal published in France existed at the time. Amongst others, some notable naturalists contributing to Der Naturforscher were:

- Johann August Ephraim Goeze
- Theodor Gottlieb von Scheven
- Josef Aloys Frölich
- Nikolaus Joseph Brahm
- Eugen Johann Christoph Esper
- Johann Kaspar Füssli
- Johann Friedrich Gmelin
- Siegmund Adrian von Rottemburg
- Jean Baptiste Louis d'Audibert de Férussac
- Johann Matthäus Bechstein
- Friedrich Christian Meuschen
- Georg Wolfgang Franz Panzer
- Johann Hermann
- Franz von Paula Schrank
- Johann Dominikus Schultze
- Johann Beckmann
- Justus Christian Loder
- Charles De Geer
- Johann Christoph Meineken (1722 -1790) Mineralogy
- Christoph Gottlieb von Murr as C. G. von M

== Impact ==
Claus Nissen described Der Naturforscher as "the most important 18th century German periodical for the descriptive natural sciences". Its taxonomic significance is considerable in entomology and conchology. Although many of the new species described here were subsequently considered junior synonyms, others remain valid.

Some of the valid species first described in Der Naturforscher are several well-known European Lepidoptera: Lysandra bellargus (Rottemburg, 1775), Polyommatus icarus (Rottemburg, 1775), Zygaena lonicerae (Scheven, 1777), Paranthrene tabaniformis (Rottemburg, 1775) and Hyles gallii (Rottemburg, 1775). Valid taxa in phylum Mollusca include Turbo canaliculatus Hermann, 1781, Spondylus americanus Hermann, 1781, Modiolarca impacta (Hermann, 1782) and Semilimax semilimax (J. Férussac, 1802).

Although most ornithology articles are general or faunal lists, an exception exists in the first description of the wood warbler, Phylloscopus sibilatrix (Bechstein, 1793).

Some exotic taxa were also first described in Der Naturforscher, including the fish species Sternoptyx diaphana Hermann, 1781 and the Indomalayan butterfly Euploea phaenareta (Schaller, 1785).

== See also ==
- Timeline of entomology – prior to 1800
- Science in the Age of Enlightenment
