= Timeline of entomology =

History of scientific study of insects

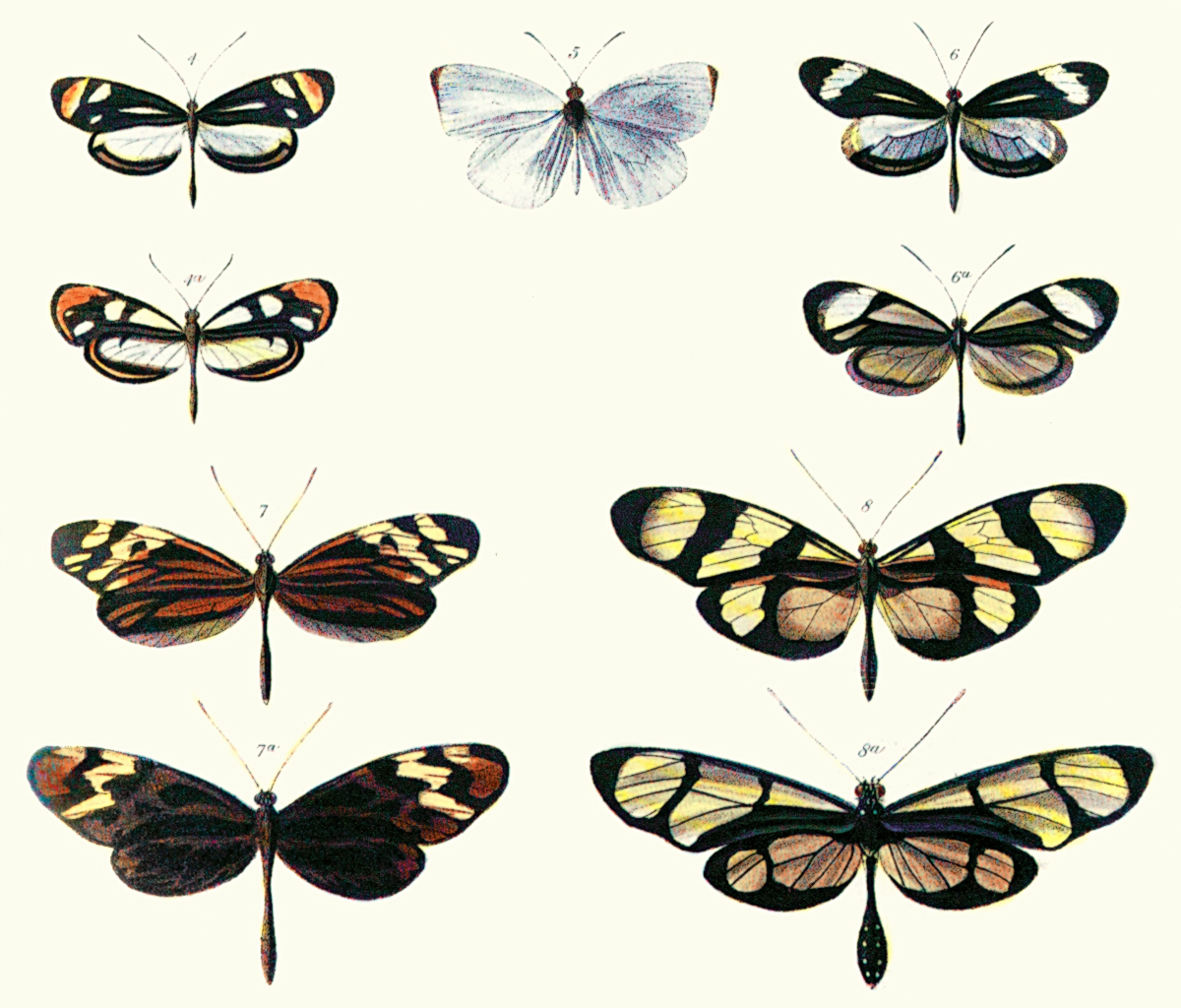
Plate from Henry Walter Bates's 1862 paper Contributions to an insect fauna of the Amazon Valley: Heliconiidae

Entomology, the scientific study of insects and closely related terrestrial arthropods, has been impelled by the necessity of societies to protect themselves from insect-borne diseases, crop losses to pest insects, and insect-related discomfort, as well as by people's natural curiosity. This timeline article traces the history of entomology.

== Timelines of entomology ==
- Timeline of entomology – prior to 1800
- Timeline of entomology – 1800–1850
- Timeline of entomology – 1850–1900
- Timeline of entomology – post 1900

=== History of classification ===
Many different classifications were proposed by early entomologists. It is important to realise that whilst many early names survive, they may be at different levels in the phylogenetic hierarchy. For instance, many families were first published as genera, as for example the genus Mymar, proposed by Alexander Henry Haliday in 1829, is now represented by the family Mymaridae.

== See also ==
- European and American voyages of scientific exploration
- List of natural history dealers
