= Von Trebra =

von Trebra is a German noble surname originating from Thuringia and Saxony. Notable people with the surname include:

- Friedrich Wilhelm Heinrich von Trebra (1740–1819), Saxon mining administrator and geologist
- Heinrich von Trebra (1830–1863), Prussian-born military officer and Union Army commander in the American Civil War

== See also ==
- Trebra, a municipality in Thuringia, Germany
