= Timeline of entomology – 1800–1850 =

Entomology, the study of insects, progressed between 1800 and 1850, with the publication of important texts, definition of new orders such as Aphaniptera and Strepsiptera, and the shift to specialization. The following timeline indicates significant events in entomology in this time period.

== 19th century ==
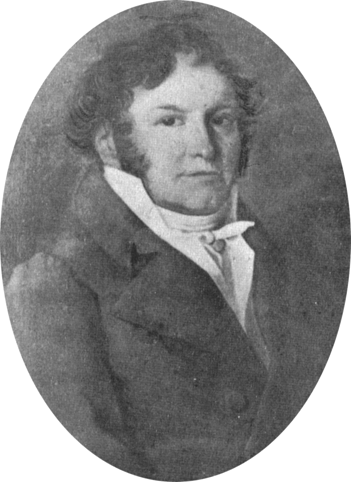
Johann Ludwig Christian Gravenhorst

Around the beginning of the 19th century, systematists began to specialise. There remained entomological polyhistors – those who continued to work on the insect fauna as a whole.

From the beginning of the century, however, the specialist began to predominate, harbingered by Johann Wilhelm Meigen's Nouvelle classification des mouches à deux aile (New classification of the Diptera) commenced in the first year of the century. Lepidopterists were amongst the first to follow Meigen's lead. The specialists fell into three categories. First there were species describers, then specialists in species recognition and then specialists in gross taxonomy. There were however considerable degrees of overlap. Also then, as now, few could entirely resist the lure of groups other than their own, and this was especially true of those in small countries where they were the sole 'expert', and many famous specialists in one order also worked on others. Hence, for instance, many works which began as butterfly faunas were completed as general regional works, often collaboratively.

"Man is born not to solve the problems of the universe, but to find out where the problem begins, and then to restrain himself within the limits of the comprehensible" Johann Wolfgang von Goethe Conversations with Eckerman: Feb. 13, 1829

1800

- Jean-Baptiste Pierre Antoine de Monet, Chevalier de Lamarck first expressed his views on evolution in lectures.
- The total number of species of insects described is estimated at not exceeding the figure of 20 000.

1801

- Publication of Jean Baptiste Pierre Antoine de Monet de Lamarck. Système des animaux sans vertèbres ou tableau général des classes, des ordres et des genres de ces animaux. Paris:Deterville in English, 'System of invertebrate animals or general table of classes, orders and genera of these animals'
- Johan Christian Fabricius Systema eleutheratorum commenced. In a series of successive works to 1806 Johan Christian Fabricius developed a classificatory system based entirely on the structure of the mouthparts.
- Johann Karl Wilhelm Illiger's Magazin für Insectenkundeor Insect Magazine commenced in Brunswick (last issue 1856). One of the first insect magazines.
- Marie Françoise Xavier Bichat. Traité d’anatomie descriptive, in English, 'Treatise on descriptive anatomy published in Paris'. This work laid the foundations of a unified structural terminology.
- The Aurelian Society meets in London "To form a complete and standard cabinet of the entomological productions of Great Britain:- to ascertain their names, uses, and distinctions:-the places and times of their appearance, food economy and peculiarities :- and to point out to the public the readiest and most desirable methods of destroying such as possess properties that are inimical to the welfare of mankind"
- First part of Pierre André Latreille's Historie naturelle, générale et particulièredes crustacés et des insects in English, 'General and particular natural history of crustaceans and insects', published in Paris by Dufart. 5817 pp.(14 volumes last published in 1805). In this and succeeding works (1806–1809, 1810, 1825, 1829 Latreille, following Linnaeus, divides the insects into Orders (at first these are called classes), invented the important family concept and also the tribus, proposed the families Asilidae, Muscidae, Syrphidae and Tabanidae (Diptera) as supra generic and erected the insect orders: Parasita, Perliarae, Megaloptera and Panorpatae.
- Lamarck and Gottfried Reinhold Treviranus, separately proposed term "biology" for the whole science of living things.
- Pietro Rossi becomes the world's first professor of entomology in Pisa.

1802

- Charles Nicholas Aubé born.

1803

- Johan Christian Fabricius Rhyngotorum secundum ordines…Reichard, Brunsvigae. Published.
- Adrian Hardy Haworth Lepidoptera Britannica (1803–1828) published. This was the most authoritative work on British butterflies and moths until Henry Tibbats Stainton's Manual in 1857.
- Johann Rudolph Schellenberg Genres des mouches Diptères représentés en XLII planches projettées, dessinées et expliquées par deux amateurs de l'entomologie published in Zürich.
- Jakob Heinrich Laspeyres Kritische Revision der neuen Ausgabe des systematischen Verzeichnisses von den Schmetterlingen der Wienergegend.Braunschweig, Karl Reichard.

1804

- Jacob Hübner Sammlung Europaischer Schmetterlinge, in English, 'Collection of European Butterflies', published in Augsburg.
- Caspar Erasmus Duftschmid Fauna Austriae, in English, 'Austrian fauna' commenced publication.
- Jacob Sturm Deutschlands Insecten, Käfer, in English, 'German Insects, Beetles' commenced. This work was not completed until 1856. Like many insect faunal works, this was planned to cover all orders but got no further than beetles.
- Thomas Marsham. Entomologica Britannica sisterns Insects Britanniae Indigena Secundum Linneum disposita in English, 'British Entomology comprising native British insects disposed (according to) Linnaeus’ second edition. The first British beetle fauna this work treated Coleoptera only.
- Jean Frederick Hermann Mémoire Aptérologique'published by F.L. Hammerin Strasbourg.

1805

- Ambroise Marie François Joseph Palisot de Beauvois 1805-1821 Insectes Recueillis en Afrique et en Amérique, in English, 'Insects found in Africa and America'
- Prodromus Entomology published

1806

- Carl August Dohrn born in Germany (States)
- Anders Gustaf Dahlbom (1806–1859) born in Sweden.
- Pierre André Latreille Genera Crustaceorum et Insectorum Secundum Ordinem Naturalem in Familias Disposita, Iconibus, Exemplisque Plurimus Explicata 4 vols. Paris 1257pp. commenced, completed 1809. Latreille wrote a series of works each revising his previous classification.
- Jacob Hübner. Tentamen determinationis, digestionis atque demonstrationis singularum stirpium Lepidopterorum, peritis ad inspiciendum et disjudicandum communicatum. published in Augsberg. In English, the title reads 'Preliminary examination. An attempt to fix, arrange and name the individual races of Lepidoptera to experts for examination and the expression of an opinion'. As its title states, this was a discussion document. Inadvertently published, it led to subsequent nomenclatural confusion.
- Maximilian Spinola Insectorum Liguriae etc. published in Genoa, Italy.
- André Marie Constant Duméril, 1806 Analitische Zoologie. Published in both French and German. This was an important text for its methodology of classification.

1807

- Louis Jurine Nouvelle Méthode de Classer les Hyménoptères et les Diptères, in English, 'New method of classifying Hymenoptera and Diptera'. Published in Genève (Geneva).
- Birth year of three specialists in Diptera, Hermann Loew, Alexander Henry Haliday and Camillo Rondani
- Guillaume-Antoine Olivier Le Voyage dans l'Empire Othoman, l'Égypte et la Perse.
- 1807: Agostino Bassi (1773–1856) begins research on a disease of the silkworm caused by fungi, preceding work of Louis Pasteur.

1808

- Publication date of Johann Cristoph Friedrich Klug Die Blattwespen nach ihren Gattungen und Arten zusammengestellt. Mag. Ges. Naturf. Freunde, in English, 'The leaf wasps arranged according to their genera and species'.
- Guillaume-Antoine Olivier Entomologie, ou Histoire naturelle des Insectes. Coléoptères.

1809

- Lamarck's views on evolution were fully elaborated in his Philosophie zoologique in which he also arranged animals according to relationships and was first to employ the genealogical tree.

1810

- Guillaume-Antoine Olivier redefined the order Orthoptera (Latreille, 1796). This Order has been subject to constant revision.
- Franco Andrea Bonelli published Observations Entomologique.
- George Perry began Arcana, also titled The museum of natural history.

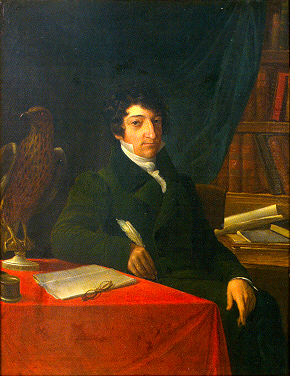
Franco Andrea Bonelli.

1811

- Gustaf von Paykull, Monographia Histeroidum Suecicae published in Uppsala. A monograph is a very complete work on a restricted subject, in this case Histeridae. This is one of the first entomological monographs.
- Kurimoto Masayoshi Kurimoto's Iconographia Insectorumor Insects of Japan published.

1812

- Birth of the entomologist Mary Ball.
- Volume 1 of the Transactions of the Entomological Society of London published (though the Society officially dates from 1832)

1813

- William Kirby erected the orders Trichoptera and Strepsiptera
- Jean Baptiste Boisduval, Faune Entomologique de Madagascarpublished.

1814

- William Elford Leach, Zoological Miscellany begun at London.
- Carl Fredrik Fallén, Diptera Sueciae, in English, Diptera of Sweden published at Lund. Fallén's 484 page "Dissertation" this specialist work was published between 1814 and 1825

1815

- William Elford Leach founded the orders Phasmida, Anoplura, Thysanura and Rhaphidides; the hemipterous families Pentatomidae, Coreidae, Belostomidae; the dipterous family Tipulidae and the hymenopterous family Chrysididae and published the first bibliography of entomology in Brewster's Edinburgh Encyclopedia.
- William Kirby and William Spence (entomologist), Introduction to entomology or elements of the natural history of insects. 4 vols. London, Longman 2430pp. This masterwork commenced in 1815 and was completed in 1826. It is an outstanding achievement: an entomology and a system of higher units in which Kirby was much influenced by MacLeay. By 1818 it was in its third edition, one of the most popular scientific works of all time.
- Johann Friedrich Eschscholtz embarks on the Russian expeditionary ship "Rurik"1815-1822
- Publication of Tome 1 of Jean Baptiste Pierre Antoine de Monet de Lamarck's Histoire naturelle des animaux sans vertèbres.. completed with Tome 7 in 1822. Paris, Verdiere.

1816

- Jacob Hübner Verzeichniss bekanuten schmetterlinge, in English, Catalogue of known butterflies published at Augsberg.
- Marie Jules Cesar Lelorgne de Savigny, Mémoires sur les animaux sans vertèbrespublished at Paris.
- Henri Marie Ducrotay de Blainville Prodrome d'une nouvelle distribution systématique du règne animal Bull. Soc. Philom. Paris
- Royal Saxony School of Forestry established at Tharandt. The school taught entomology and later the dipterist Samuel Friedrich Stein became its director.
- First issue of Oken's Isis, eine encyclopädische Zeitschrift, vorzüglich für Naturgeschichte, vergleichende Anatomie und Physiologie published.

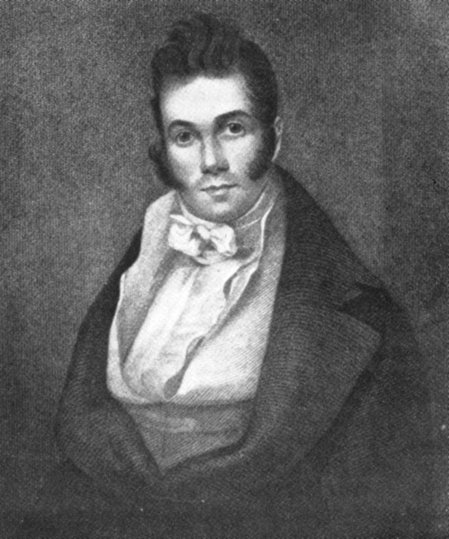
Thomas Say.

1817

- First volume of Thomas Say's American entomology published in Philadelphia. The pioneering work of American entomology. Some of the illustrations were undertaken by Titian Peale .
- Carl Rheinhold Sahlberg, Dissertatio entomologica insecta Fennica enumerans (Coleoptera) commenced. First work on the Coleoptera of Finland. Due to the efforts of Paykull, Leonard Gyllenhaal and Sahlberg the beetles of Scandinavia were better known than in any comparable area at this date.

1818

- Johann Wilhelm Meigen Systematische Beschreibung der Bekannten Europäischen zweiflugen Insecten 7 vols. Aachen and Hamm 2869pp., in English, Systematic Descriptions of known European Two-winged Insects commenced. The seven volumes spanned the years 1818-1830. Nouvelle classification des mouches à deux ailes. Paris. New classification of the Diptera had already appeared, published in Paris.
- Carl Gustav Carus Lehrbuch der Zootomie. Leipzig. Lehrbuchs are student texts. This one is on anatomy, mainly dissection.
- Friedrich Wilhelm Ludwig Suckow Anatomisch-physiologische Untersuchungen der Insecten und Krustenthiere. 70 S. mit 11 Kupfern. Engelmann, Heidelberg.
- Georg Adolf Keferstein publishes a history of silk moth culture - Ueber den Bombyx der Alten in Magazin der Entomologie, Halle

1819

- George Samouelle publishes A nomenclature of British Entomology, or a catalogue of above 4000 species of the Classes Crustacea, Myriapoda, Spiders, Mites and insects intended as labels for cabinets of Insects, etc., alphabetically arranged at London.

1820

- Carl Fredrik Fallèn Monographia Muscidum Suecia commenced.
- Philogène Auguste Joseph Duponchel with Jean Baptiste Godart, in English, Histoire Naturelle des Lépidoptères de Francecommenced. This was the first really good French butterfly fauna.
- Johann Fischer von Waldheim Entomographia Imperii Russici, Genera Insectorum Systematice Exposita et Analysi Inconographia Instructa published in Moscow.
- Gustaf Johan Billberg Enumeratio insectorum in museo Gust. Joh. Billberg. Typus Gadelianus.

1821

- John Fleming Insecta. In: Supplement to the fourth, fifth and sixth editions of the Encyclopædia Britannica, with preliminary dissertations on the history of the sciencesan important systematic work.

1822

- Jacob Johann Hagenbach Insectorum Helvetiae exhibentia vel species novas vel nondum depictas. Basel

1823

- Philipp Franz von Siebold begins natural history studies in Japan. Some of his many Japanese students take up entomology. The species they discovered were described in European journals without explicit attribution. They are honoured here. The invertebrate volume of Siebold's Fauna Japonica was undertaken by Wilhem de Haan
- Johann Wilhelm Dalman 1823, publishes Analeceta Entomologica Stockholm

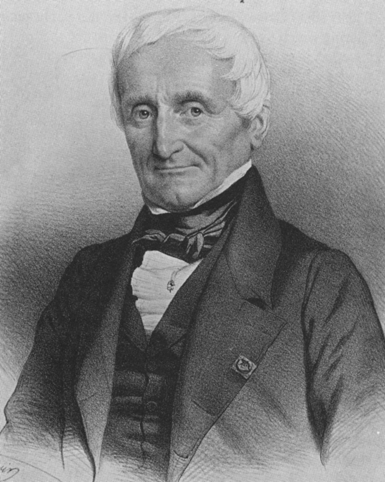
Constant Duméril.

1824

- John Curtis with Alexander Henry Haliday and Francis Walker British Entomology, being illustrations and descriptions of the genera of insects found in Great Britain and Ireland; containing coloured figures from nature of the most rare and beautiful species, and in many instances of the plants upon which they are found 16 volumes 193 Folios 770 coloured plates commenced. A masterpiece of the engraver's and colourist's art, this work includes new classifications and many new species descriptions. The work falls between the illustrated works with little text of the previous years and the minimally illustrated revisions and monographs of later years.
- Leon Jean Marie Dufour, Recherches anatomiques sur les Carabiques et sur plusiers autres Coléoptères.published at Paris.

1825

- Pierre André Latreille Familles Naturelles du Règne Animal published. In this publication the name Insecta is finally restricted to the hexapod arthropods here called Class Hexapoda.
- Pierre François Marie Auguste Dejean Species Général des Coléoptères commenced (five volumes devoted to Carabidae) C. Aubé wrote the sixth on Hydrocanthares completing the work in 1838. It is a masterpiece of descriptive entomology.

1826

- Carl Fredrik Fallén Hemiptera Sueciae.
- William Kirby erected the order Aphaniptera for the fleas.
- William Sharp MacLeay Horae entomologicae

1827

- Pierre Léonard Vander Linden commenced Observations sur les Hyménoptères d’Europe de la famille des Fouisseurs.
- Jean Nicolas Vallot published Détermination précise des insectes nuisibles, mentionnés dans les différents traités relatifs à la culture des arbres fruitiers, et indications des moyens à employer pour s'opposer à leurs ravages

1828

- James Francis Stephens Illustrations of British Entomologypublished.
- Christian Gottfried Daniel Nees von Esenbeck Monographie der Ichneumone . A seminal work on Ichneumonidae in two volumes.
- Karl Ernst von Baer Uber Entwickelungsgeschichte der Thiere published. Baer was an embryologist whose "biogenetic law" of recapitulation was a major reference point for 19th century evolutionary theory.
- Pierre Boitard publishes Manuel d'entomologie, ou Histoire naturelle des insectes : contenant la synonymie et la description de la plus grande partie des espèces d'Europe et des espèces exotiques les plus remarquables (Roret, Paris)

1829

- Jean Baptiste Boisduval and John Eatton Le Conte published first installment of Histoire général et iconographie des lepidoptérès et des chenilles de l’Amerique septentrionale at Paris. (English title: General history and illustrations of the Lepidoptera and moths (sic) of North(ern) America.) Publication of installments continued through 1837.
- Georges Cuvier, Regne Animalium, in English, The Animal Kingdom, published by Chez Deterville at Paris.
- Hermann Burmeister De Insectorum Systemate Naturali (Diss., Grunert, Halle)
- Johann Friedrich von Eschscholtz Zoölogische atlas enthaltend abbildungen neuer thierasten während Kotzebues Zweiter reise um die welt gesammelt, in English, Zoological Atlas containing illustrations of the animals collected during Kotzebues etc.. Second travels around the world 1823-1826 published at Berlin.
- Pierre Lyonet Anatomie de différentes espèces d’insectes published Paris
- Pierre François Marie Auguste Dejean, Jean Baptiste Boisduval and Charles Nicholas Aubé. Iconographie et histoire naturelle des Coléoptères d’Europe.
- Alfred Brehm's Tierleben (English title: Brehm's Life of Animals) commenced publication.Very popular it was published in many expanded editions the six volumes published between 1864 and 1869 was titled Illustrirtes Thierleben, Ernst Ludwig Taschenberg wrote the entomological sections.
- Christian Friedrich Freyer published Beitrage zur Geschichte europaischer Schmetterlinge mit Abbildungen nach der Natur.

1830

- Controversy between Georges Cuvier and Étienne Geoffroy Saint-Hilaire on the fixity of types.
- Maximilian Perty Delectus Animalium Articulatorum quae in itinere per Brasiliam Annis MDCCCXVII - MDCCCXX Iussu et Auspiciis Maximiliani Josephi I. Bavariae Regis Augustissimi, percato collegerunt Dr J. B. de Spix et Dr. C. F. Ph. de Martius. (completed 1834)

1831

- Félix Édouard Guérin-Méneville. Magasin de Zoologie, d’Anatomie Comparée et Palaeoentomologie, in English, Magazine of Zoology, Comparative Anatomy and Palaeoentomology commenced publication.
- George Newport, Nervous system of Sphinx ligustri. London
- Jean Guillaume Audinet-Serville published Revue méthodique de l’ordre des Orthoptères
- Thaddeus William Harris prepared a catalogue of insects for Edward Hitchcock's Report on the Geology, Mineralogy, Botany and Zoology of Massachusetts.
- Jean-Baptiste Deyrolle, natural history dealer opened for business at 23, Rue de la Monnaie, Paris later assisted by his son Achille Deyrolle. Deyrolle et fils published many entomological works.

1832

- Société Entomologique de France founded at Paris. The first president was Amédée Louis Michel le Peletier, comte de Saint-Fargeau
- Hermann Burmeister, Handbuch der Entomologie, in English, Handbook of entomology, commenced publication.
- Jules Dumont d'Urville Voyage de l'Astrolabe. Faune entomologique de l'Océanie par le Dr Boisduval. Tome 1 : Lepidoptéres (1832) published; Tome 2 Coléoptères, Hémiptères, Orthoptères, Névroptères, Hyménoptères et Diptères was published in 1835.
- Felipe Poey Centurie de Lépidoptères de l'Ile de Cuba published at Paris.
- Hermann Friedrich Stannius Beiträge zur Entomologie, besondere in Bezug auf Schlesien, gemeinschaftlich mit Schummel. Breslau, published.

1833

- Alexander Henry Haliday, An essay on the classification of the parasitic Hymenoptera of Britain which correspond with the Ichneumones minuti of Linnaeus. Entomol. Mag. First part of a seminal work on Hymenoptera erecting major taxa (phylogenetic divisions).
- Carl Johan Schönherr, Leonard Gyllenhaal and Carl Henrik Boheman. Genera and species of Curculionidae. 8 vols. Paris,1833-1844 commenced.
- Francis Walker, Monographia Chalcidum. London, 1833–1842, commenced. Much of this work was collaborative with Alexander Henry Haliday who was the sole author of the sectional diagnoses.
- Louis Alexandre Auguste Chevrolat, Coléoptères de Mexique.
- Pierre François Marie Auguste Dejean, Catalogue des Coléoptères. Paris.
- George Robert Gray The Entomology of Australia: Monograph of the Genus Phasma Volume 1 Masterly work on Phasmidae.The first work on this group since Caspar Stoll (1780). Very often a monograph is separated from its successor by thirty to fifty years.
- Thaddeus William Harris Report on the Geology, Mineralogy, Botany, and Zoology of Massachusetts published.
- Julius Theodor Christian Ratzeburg Die Forstinsekten, Berlin 1837–1844 commenced. This is a founding work of forest entomology.

1834

- Entomological Society of London founded.
- François-Louis Laporte, comte de Castelnau Études entomologique. Introduction à l’entomologie in Suites à Buffon. Paris 1834–1863.
- Pierre-Justin-Marie Macquart Histoire Naturelle des Insectes Diptères published.

1835

- Constantin Wesmael commences publication of Monographie des Braconides de Belgique

1836

- Alfred Ronalds. The Fly-fisher's Entomology first edition published.
- Wilhelm Ferdinand Erichson published Die Kafer der Mark Brandenburg.
- Charles Athanase Walckenaer and Paul Gervais commenced Histoire naturelle des insectes.

1837

- Oswald Heer published Die Kafer der Schweiz
- Second edition of John Curtis "A guide to the arrangement of British insects being a catalogue of all the named species hitherto discovered in Great Britain and Ireland " published. The list contains 1500 generic and 15,000 specific names.
- Carl Gustaf Mannerheim (naturalist) Mémoire sur quelques genres et espèces de Carabiques published.
- Achille Rémy Percheron publishes Bibliographie entomologique listing more than 5 000 authors and 500 anonymous contributions.

1838

- Johan Wilhelm Zetterstedt Insecta Lapponica Descripta. Leipzig: Voss 1145pp (1838–1842) commences publication.
- Benjamin Dann Walsh left England for the United States of America . He was a pioneer of applied entomology.

1839

- John Obadiah Westwood. First part of An introduction to the modern classification of insects. ( 1839–1840) published.
- John Forbes Royle Illustrations of the Botany and Other Branches of the Natural History of the Himalayan Mountains, and of the Flora of Cashmere published. This work resembles 18th century works in its sumptuous illustration.
- Meyers Konversations-Lexikon commenced. Entomology was a favourite topic.

1839

- Étienne Mulsant. Histoire naturelle des Coléoptères de France.13 pts. Paris and Lyon,1839-1863 published.
- James Francis Stephens Manual of British Coleoptera or Beetles This work contains diagnoses of 3462 species and remained the standard work until the appearance of the Handbook of the Coleoptera by H.E. Cox was published in 1875. An instance of the longevity of some taxonomic works.
- Alexander Henry Haliday, Hymenopterorum Synopsis and Methodum Fallenii ut plurimum accomodata (Belfast) 8 4pg. s.titulo. This work on classification was privately printed. Very few copies survive. The same is true of many important works of other authors.
- Edward Newman founded The Entomologist (an insect magazine) at London.
- Giuseppe Gené De quibusdam insectis Sardiniae novis aut minus cognitis. Fascicle 2. Mem. R. Accad. Sci. Torino (2)1: 43-84

1840

- Jean Baptiste Alphonse Dechauffour de Boisduval Genera et index methodicus Europaeorum lepidopterorum. published in Paris.
- Theodor Becker born.
- Jan Dzierżon designed a movable-frame beehive, the first of many apicultural advances he initiated.

1841

- William Wilson Saunders becomes president of the Entomological Society of London.

1842

- Jean Victoire Audouin publishes Histoire des insectes nuisibles à la vigne et particulièrement de la Pyrale.
- Jules Pierre Rambur publishes Histoire naturelle des insectes.

1843

- Johann Heinrich Kaltenbach. Published Monographie der familien der Pflanzenhauseat Aachen. A monograph on Thysanoptera.
- Henry Noel Humphreys, an illustrator and John Obadiah Westwood British Moths and their Transformations London: William Smith, 1843-1845. 2 Volumes. Humphreys orchestrated the overall work and provided all illustrations. Westwood provided the various scientific descriptions.
- Anders Gustaf Dahlbom Hymenoptera Europaea Praecipue Borealia 1-2. Lundberg, Lund 1008 pp. commenced publication (completed 1854)
- Alcide d'Orbigny began Dictionnaire Universel d'Histoire Naturelle. This work was finished in 1849.

1844

- Thomas Workman born.

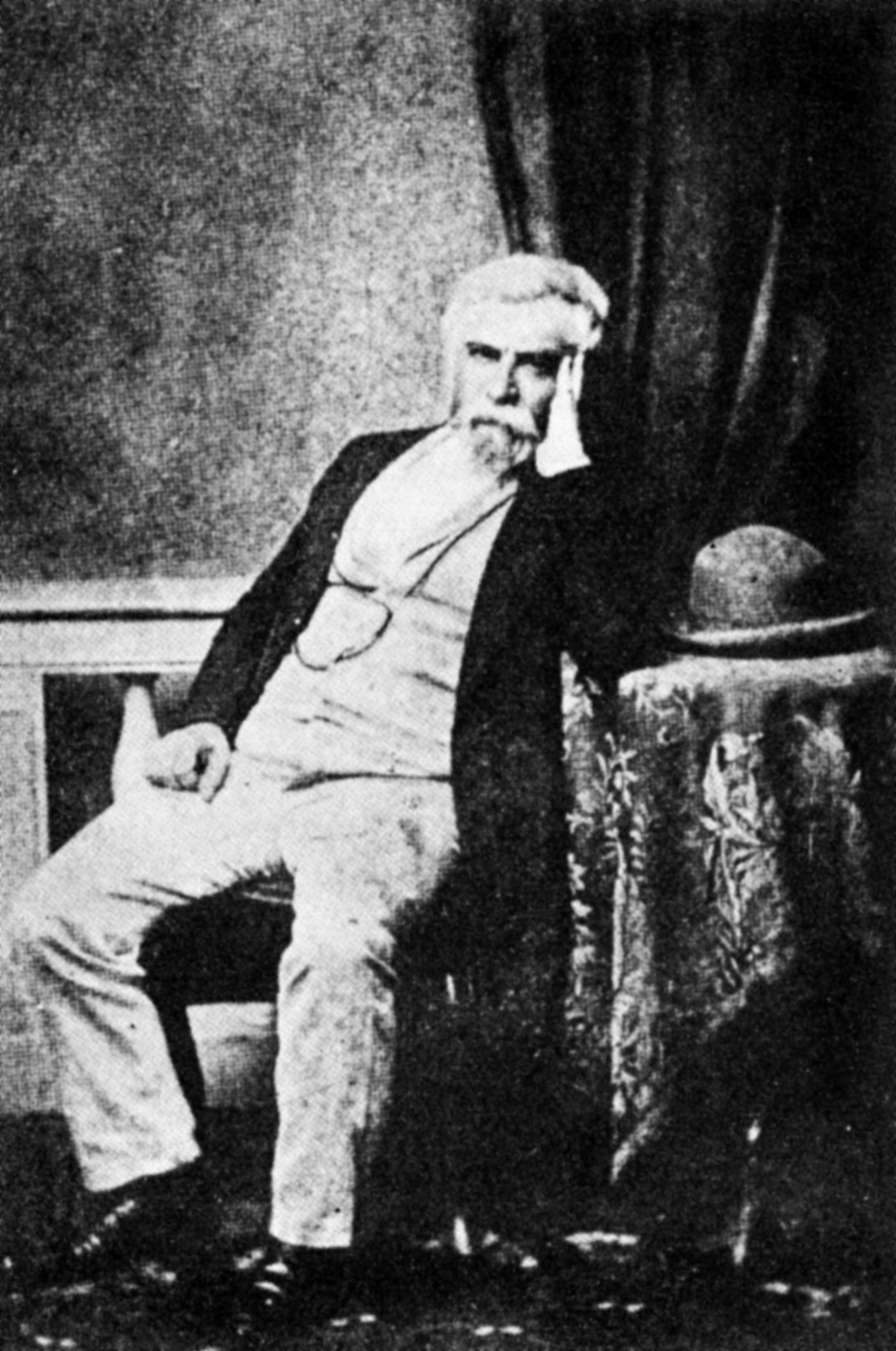
Victor Ivanovitsch Motschulsky.

1845

- Netherlands Entomological Society founded.

1846

- Smithsonian Institution founded in Washington, D.C.
- Ida Laura Pfeiffer begins her first trip around the world.
- Friederike Lienig publishes Lepidopterologische Fauna von Livland und Curland

1847

- Edmond Ruffin publishes a study of the life history and cultural control of the "Corn or fly-weevil" (Sitotroga cerealella Olivier) in the Farmers Register. Fourteen years later Edmond Ruffin pulled the lanyard on one of the columbiads off Morris Island the first shot fired in the American Civil War but not the first entomologist to engage in violent politics.
- Hercule Nicolet Essai sur une classification des insectes aptères, de l'ordre des Thysanoures.
- North American typhus epidemic

1848

- Carl Theodore Ernst von Siebold establishes the phylum Arthropoda.
- Maximilien de Chaudoir.Memoire sur la famille des Carabiques. 6 parts.published at Moscow.
- John Obadiah Westwood The Cabinet of Oriental Entomology
- Charles Jean Baptiste Amyot 1848. Entomologie Française. Rhynchotes. Méthode mononymique Paris, J.-B. Bailliere, Libraire de l'Acad. An important step forward in the classification of Coleoptera.

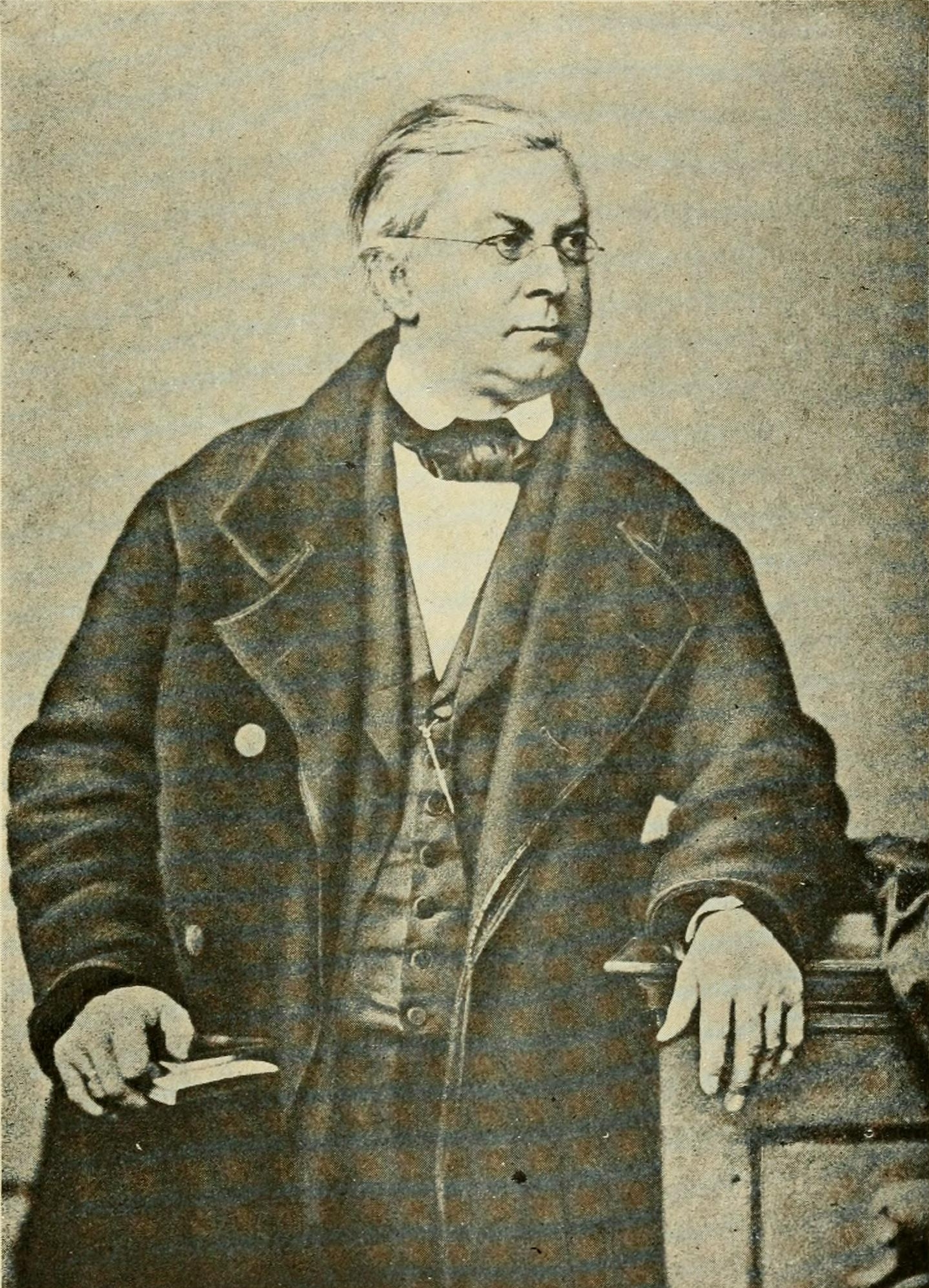
Karl Theodor Ernst von Siebold.

1849

- Étienne Mulsant Species des Coléoptères Trimères sécuripalpes. 2 parts. Lyon,1849-1853.
- Hope Chair of Zoology established at Oxford by Frederick William Hope and occupied by John Obadiah Westwood.
- Alexander von Humboldt.Ansichten der Natur.Stuttgart.

== See also ==
- Timeline of entomology — for a list of other available time periods
- List of entomologists
