= Friedrich Wilhelm Heinrich von Trebra =

Saxon mining administrator (1740–1819)

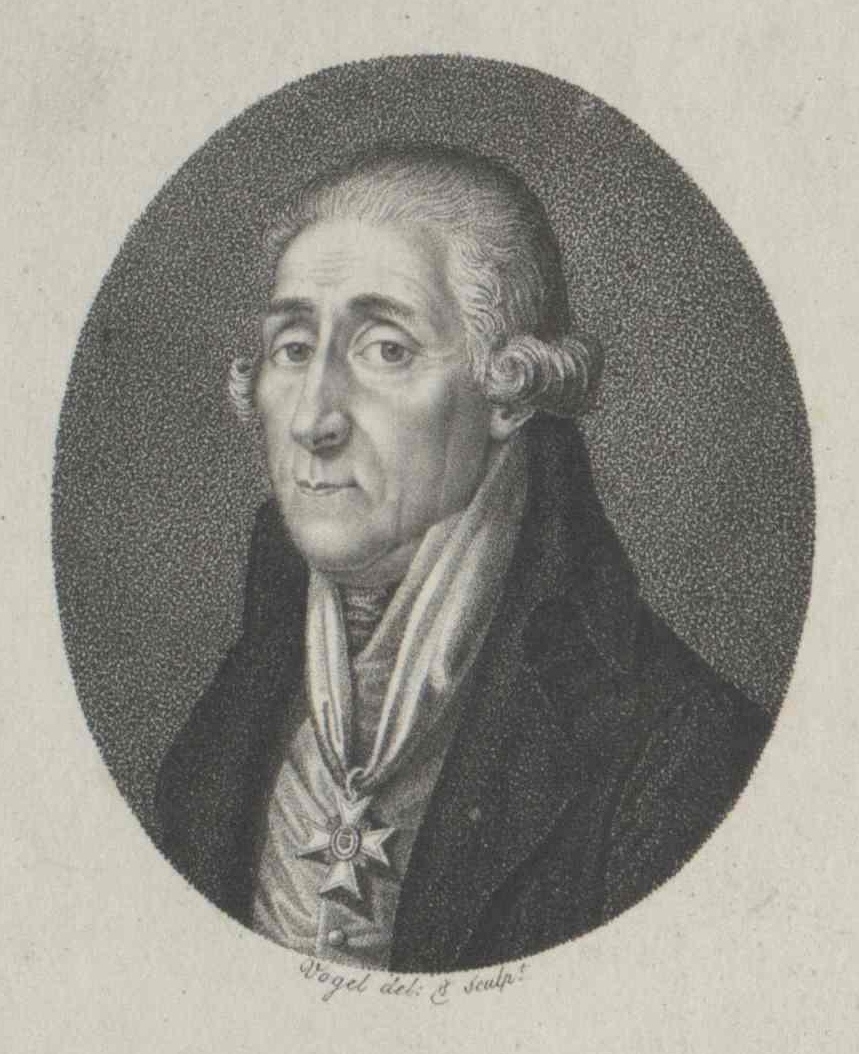

Friedrich Wilhelm Heinrich von Trebra (5 April 1740 – 16 July 1819) was a mining officer in Saxony. He took an interest in geology and was a friend of Johann Wolfgang von Goethe who worked in Ilmenau. He was involved in the recovery of Saxon mining following the Seven Years' War.

Trebra came from a noble family of Thuringia and was born in Allstedt, son of Christoph Heinrich von Trebra (1694-1745) and Amalia Carolina Liberta née von Werder. He studied at Roßleben and law at the University of Jena before joining the newly created mining school in Freiberg after meeting Friedrich Anton von Heynitz in 1766. He then became a superintendent (Bergmeister) of the mines in Marienberg in 1767 and rose to mining captain in 1773. He was in charge of mines in Saxony for which he got Dutch investors and introduced a number of innovations including improved conditions of the miners. He became a friend of Goethe who was in charge of the mines at Ilmenau. He moved to Clausthal in 1779 to replace Claus Friedrich von Reden. Trebra founded a society for mining science, the Societät der Bergbaukunde in 1786. He attempted to bring in new subjects at the Bergakademie but conflicted with Abraham Gottlob Werner. He resigned in 1795 and moved to his estate in Bretleben where he worked on agriculture. He took a position as inspector of mines for Saxony in 1801 and remained there until his death.

== See also ==
- Von Trebra
