= Johann August Ephraim Goeze =

German entomologist (1731–1793)

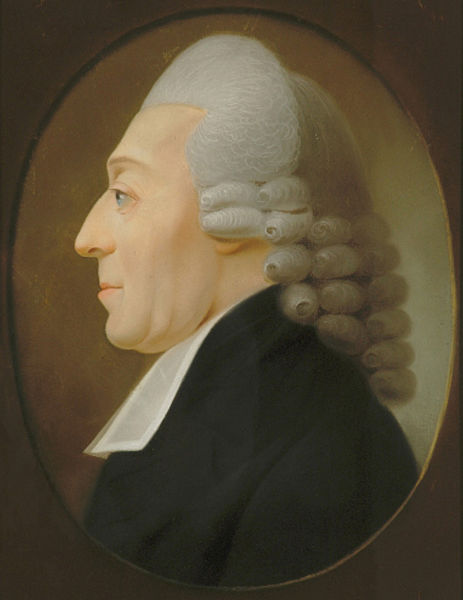
- Johann August Ephraim Goeze
- Born: 28 May 1731; Aschersleben, Principality of Halberstadt, Holy Roman Empire
- Died: 27 June 1793 (aged 62); Quedlinburg, Kingdom of Prussia, Holy Roman Empire
- Education: University of Halle
- Scientific career
- Fields: Zoology

Johann August Ephraim Goeze (German: [joˈhan ˈʔaʊɡʊst ˈʔeːfʁa.ɪm ˈɡœtsə]; 28 May 1731 – 27 June 1793) was a German pastor and zoologist, born in Aschersleben. He translated numerous works on zoology into German and conducted microscopic observations on organisms. He is best known for the discovery of tardigrades in 1773, which he called "water bears".

== Life and work ==
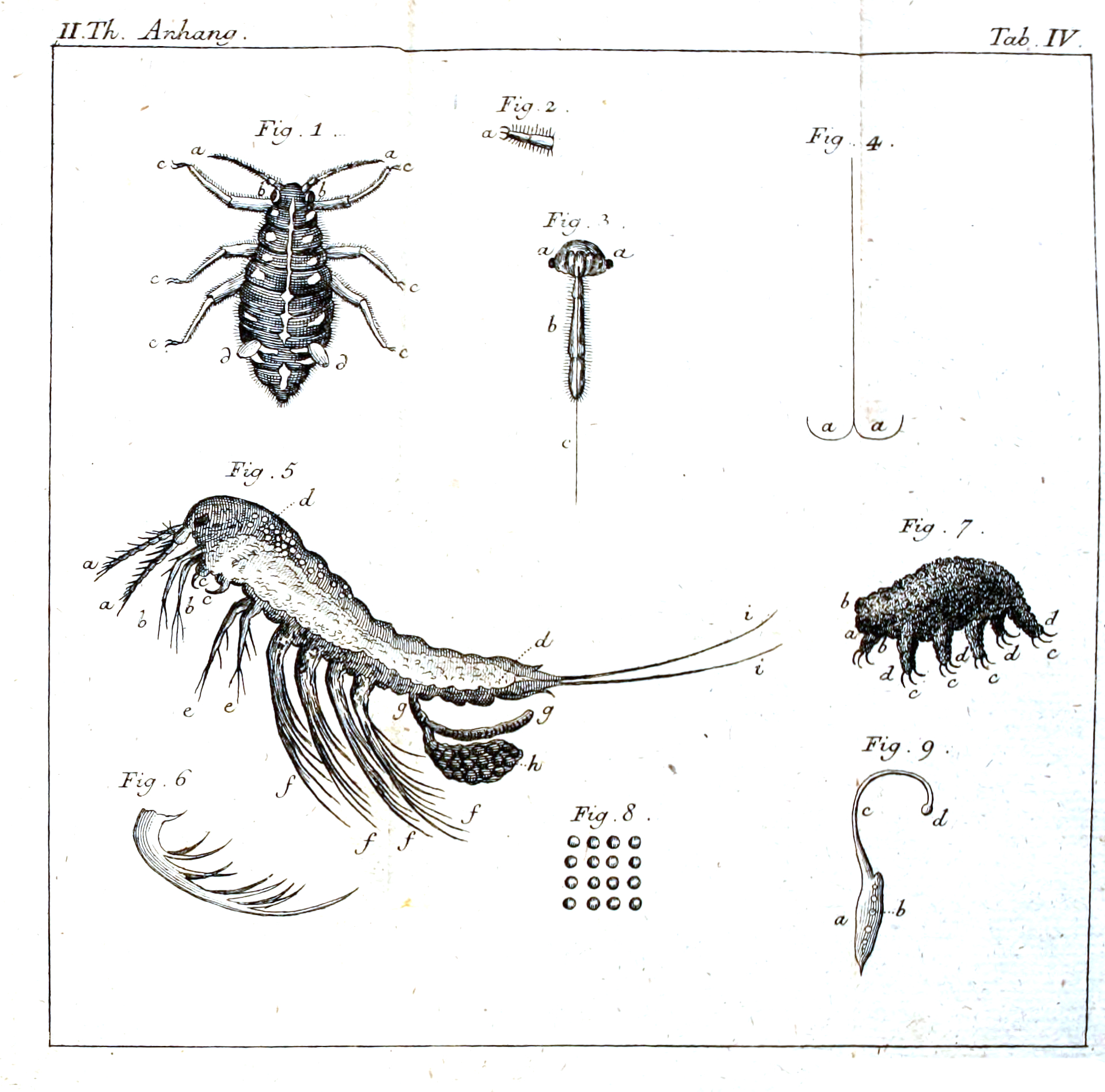
Goeze's 1773 illustration of a "water bear" (fig. 7)

Goeze was the son of Johann Heinrich and Catherine Margarete (née Kirchhoff). He studied theology and philosophy at the University of Halle. He married Leopoldine Maria Keller in 1770, with whom he had four children. In 1751, he became a pastor in Aschersleben, in Quedlinburg, and later of St. Blasius' Church in Quedlinburg in 1762, finally becoming first deacon of the seminary of Quedlinburg in 1787. He died in Quedlinburg.

Around 1772, Goeze’s intellectual interests turned from the history of the Reformation to zoology. While visiting the optician Samuel Gottlieb Hoffmann in Leipzig, Goeze saw a microscope for the first time. Immediately fascinated, he purchased it—selling his personal library to do so. He then began to explore the microscopic world, focusing on aquatic invertebrates, particularly insects and worms. In 1784, Goeze perceived the similarities between the heads of tapeworms found in the human intestinal tract and the invaginated heads of Cysticercus cellulosae in pigs. In 1773, he was the first to describe tardigrades, naming them Kleiner Wasserbär, meaning 'little water-bear'. He described it under the title "Von einigen merkwürdigen Wasserinsekten" ("On Some Remarkable Water Insects") in an appendix to a translation of Charles Bonnet’s Traité d’Insectologie that he published. He illustrated it and it has been considered to represent the genus Hypsibius. In 1776, he published a translation of Philippe Fermin's work that included notes on the biology of the Surinam toad. In 1778, he identified the so-called Quedlinburg "unicorn” skeleton as being that of a rhinoceros and considered whether the region’s climate might have changed over time. He also took a special interest in helminths and collected tapeworm specimens. This collection was purchased for 1000 thaler by Emperor Joseph II for the University of Pavia.

== Works ==
- Goeze, J. A. E. 1776. Verzeichnisse der Namen von Insecten und Wurmern, welche in dem Rosel, Kleemann und De Geer vorkommen. Naturforscher 9: 61-78 [1776], 81-85.
- with Charles De Geer Abhandlungen zur Geschichte der Insekten. Aus dem Französischen übersetzt und mit Anmerkungen hrsg. von Johann August Ephraim Goeze. Leipzig: J. C. Müller, 1776–1783.
- Goeze, J. A. E. 1782. Des Herrn Baron Karl Degeer Koniglichen Hofmarschalls .... Abhandlungen zur Geschichte der Insekten aus dem Franzosischen ubersetzt und mit Anmerkungen herausgegeben. Volume 6. 200 pp., 30 pls. Raspe, Nurnberg.
- Goeze, J. A. E. 1783. Entomologische Beyträge zu des Ritter Linné zwölften Ausgabe des Natursystems. Dritten Theiles vierter Band. - pp. I-XX, 1-178. Leipzig. (Weidmanns Erben und Reich).
- Goeze, J. A. E. 1787. Versuch einer Naturgeschichte der Eingeweidewūrmer thierischer Körper.

== Sources ==
- Allgemeine Deutsche Biographie (ADB). Band 9, Duncker & Humblot, Leipzig 1879, S. 530.online
- Allen G. Debus (dir.) (1968). World Who’s Who in Science. A Biographical Dictionary of Notable Scientists from Antiquity to the Present. Marquis-Who’s Who (Chicago) : xvi + 1855 p.
