= James Barbut =

English painter and naturalist

- Born: c. 1711
- Died: 31 May 1791 (aged 79–80)
- Occupations: Artist, painter, naturalist, bank officer

James Barbut, sometimes Jacques (c. 1711 – 31 May 1791) was an English painter and naturalist.

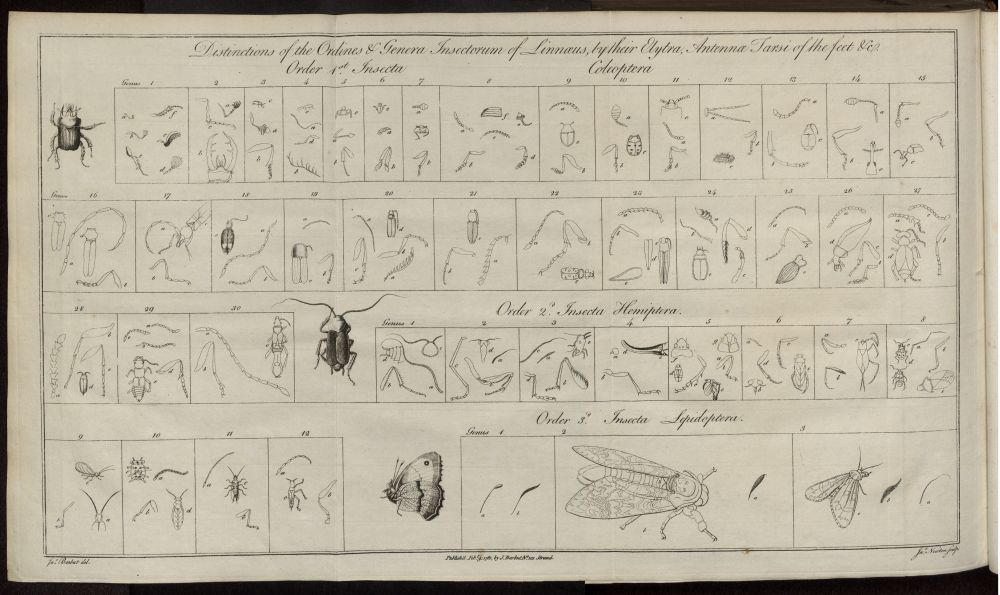
Plate XXI from The genera insectorum of Linnæus exemplified in various specimens of English insects drawn from nature

== Works ==
- Barbut, J. 1781. The genera insectorum of Linnæus exemplified in various specimens of English insects drawn from nature. Les genres des insectes de Linné; constatés par divers échantillons d'insectes d'Angleterre, copiés d'après nature. London. (Dixwell).
- Barbut, J. 1783. The genera vermium exemplified by various specimens of the animals contained in the orders of the Intestina et Mollusca Linnæi. Drawn from nature. London. (Dixwell).
- Barbut, J. 1788. The genera vermium of Linnæus part 2d. Exemplified by several of the rarest and most elegant subjects in the orders of the Testacea, Lithophyta, and Zoophyta Animalia, accurately drawn from nature. With explanations in English and French. London. (White).
