= Kairali =

Kairali literally means "originating from Kerala", or anything at all related to Kerala, a state in India. It may refer to:

- Malayalam, Dravidian language spoken in the state
- Kairali TV, a Malayalam television channel
- MV Kairali, an Indian merchant ship which disappeared in 1979
- Kairali Airlines, a defunct Indian airline
- Swaralaya Kairali Yesudas Award, Indian music award
- Kairali School, a public school in Ranchi, Jharkhand, India

== See also ==
- Kerala (disambiguation)
- Dhundi-Kairali dialect, spoken in parts of Punjab and Azad Kashmir
