= Chera (disambiguation) =

Chera dynasty was an Indian dynasty that ruled over parts of the present-day states of Kerala and Tamil Nadu during the early historic period.

Chera may also refer to:

Medieval Indian dynasties

- Chera Perumals of Makotai, rulers of Kerala
- Kongu Chera dynasty, rulers of western Tamil Nadu
- Athiyaman (Sathiyaputhra), rulers of north-western Tamil Nadu
- Venadu kingdom, rulers of southern Kerala

Others

- Chera (moth), a genus of moths of the family Noctuidae
- Chera, Valencia, a municipality in Spain
- Chera Dwip, a coral reef extension off St. Martin's Island, Bangladesh
- Stanley Chera (1942–2020), American real estate developer
- Jean Chera (born 1995), Brazilian footballer

== See also ==
- Cheras (disambiguation)
- Cheran (disambiguation)
- Cheran, Iran (disambiguation)
- Cera (disambiguation)
- Kerala (disambiguation)
