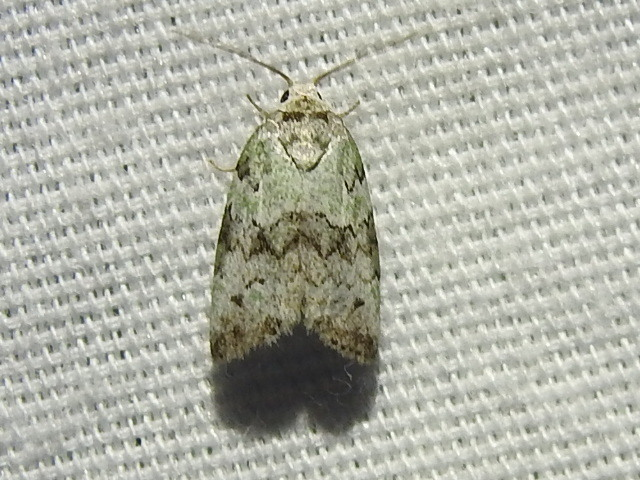

Scientific classification
- Kingdom: Animalia
- Phylum: Arthropoda
- Clade: Pancrustacea
- Class: Insecta
- Order: Lepidoptera
- Superfamily: Noctuoidea
- Family: Nolidae
- Genus: Afrida
- Species: A. ydatodes

Binomial name
- Afrida ydatodes Dyar, 1913

Synonyms
- Aresia parva Barnes & McDunnough, 1913

= Afrida ydatodes =

Species of moth

Afrida ydatodes, or Dyar's lichen moth, is a species of moth in the family Nolidae (nolid moths). It was described by Harrison Gray Dyar Jr. in 1913 and is found in North America, where it has been recorded from Alabama, Florida, Mississippi, North Carolina and Texas.

== Description ==
The wingspan is about 10 mm. Adults are similar to Afrida cosmiogramma, but diffused and irrorated. The white areas are pale grey from the dark irrorations and the central band is clouded and dark, its edges not forming strong lines, but only a little darker. The hindwings are whitish, with a grey discal point and terminal border.
