= Keraleeyam =

Keraleeyam may refer to:

- Keraleeyam (magazine), a Malayalam language publication in India
- Keraleeyam (festival), an event in Thiruvananthapuram, India

== See also ==
- Kerala (disambiguation)
