= Blenina accipiens =

Scientific classification
- Kingdom: Animalia
- Phylum: Arthropoda
- Class: Insecta
- Order: Lepidoptera
- Superfamily: Noctuoidea
- Family: Nolidae
- Genus: Blenina
- Species: B. accipiens

Binomial name
- Blenina accipiens Walker, [1858]

Species of moth

Blenina accipiens is a moth of the family Nolidae first described by Francis Walker in 1858. It is found in India, Sri Lanka, Myanmar and Australia.

== Description ==
The wingspan of the male is 36 mm. It is similar to Blenina donans. It differs in having a brownish thorax. Forewings with fuscous brown suffusion. Hindwings with brownish basal half suffusion. Outer band more irregular.
