= Cheran, Iran =

Cheran or Charan (Persian: چران) in Iran may refer to:

- Cheran, East Azerbaijan
- Charan, Gilan
- Cheran, Razavi Khorasan

== See also ==
- Cheran (disambiguation)
- Charan (disambiguation)
