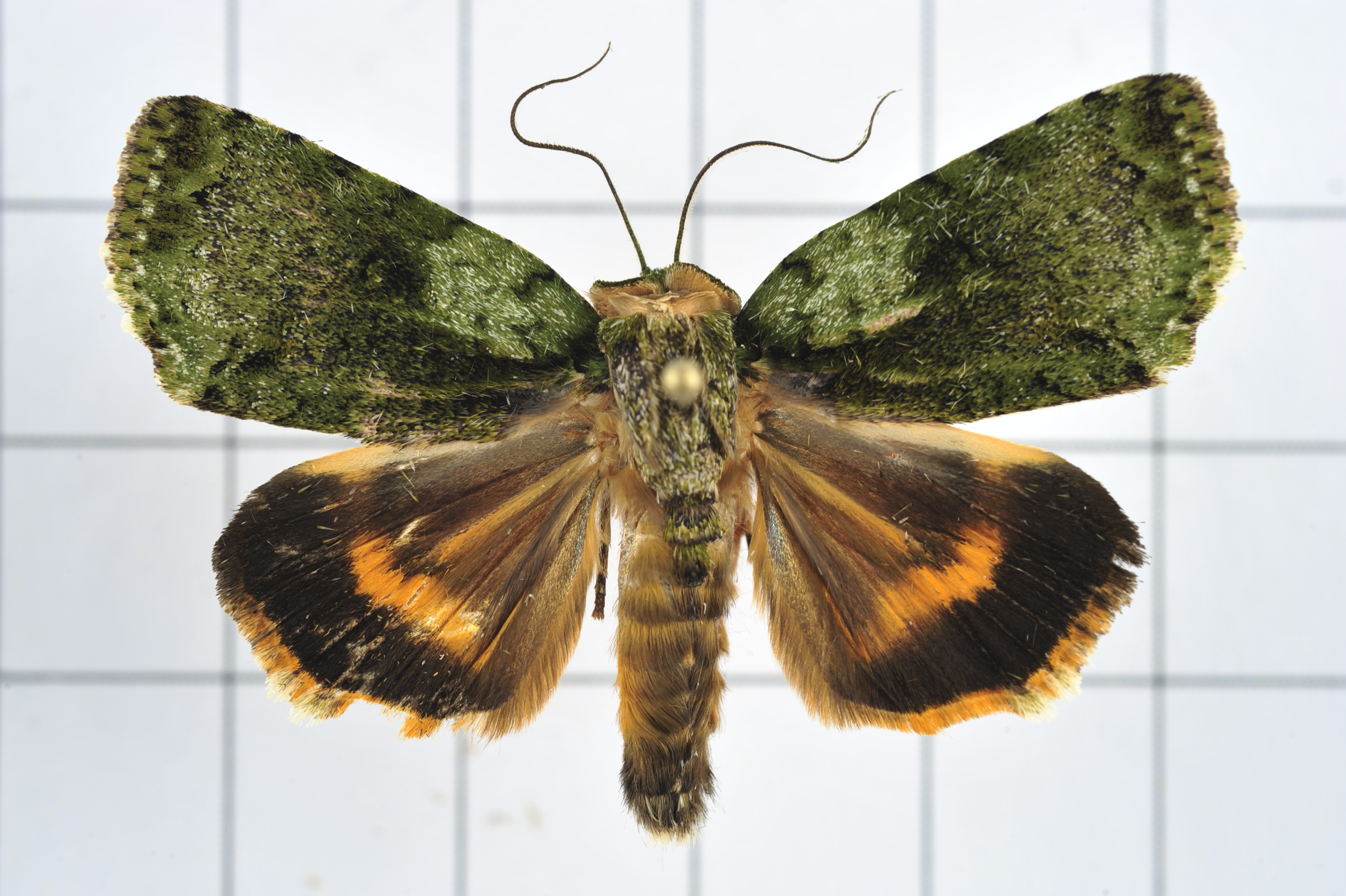

Scientific classification
- Kingdom: Animalia
- Phylum: Arthropoda
- Class: Insecta
- Order: Lepidoptera
- Superfamily: Noctuoidea
- Family: Nolidae
- Genus: Blenina
- Species: B. chlorophila

Binomial name
- Blenina chlorophila Hampson, 1905

= Blenina chlorophila =

Species of moth

Blenina chlorophila is a moth of the family Nolidae first described by George Hampson in 1905. It is found in India, Sri Lanka, Taiwan, Peninsular Malaysia and Borneo.

== Description ==
Its forewings have green and grayish variegations. The hindwings are dark blackish brown. There is a sinuous dark yellowish medial band in the hindwings. Its larval food plants are from the genus Shorea.

== Gallery ==
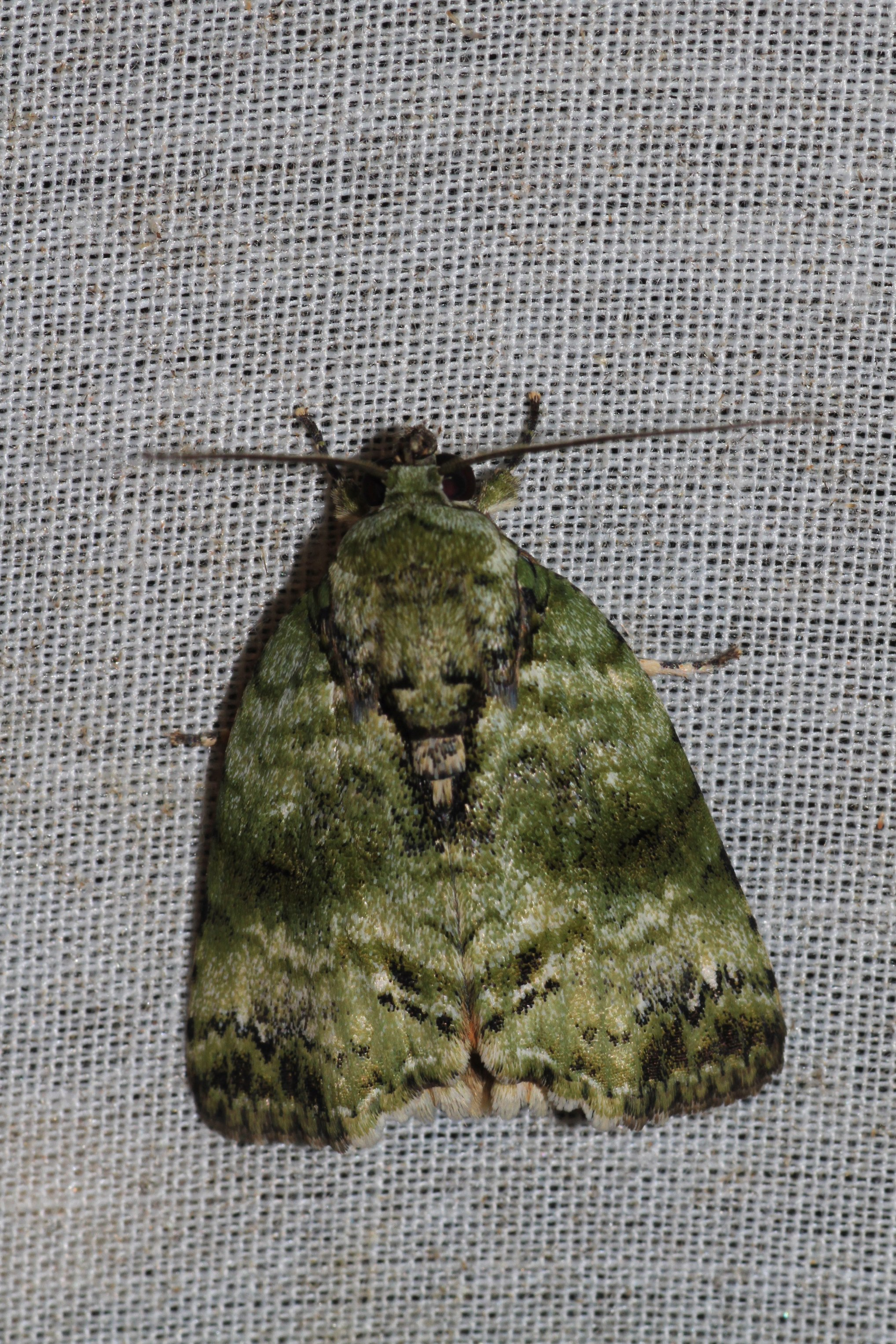

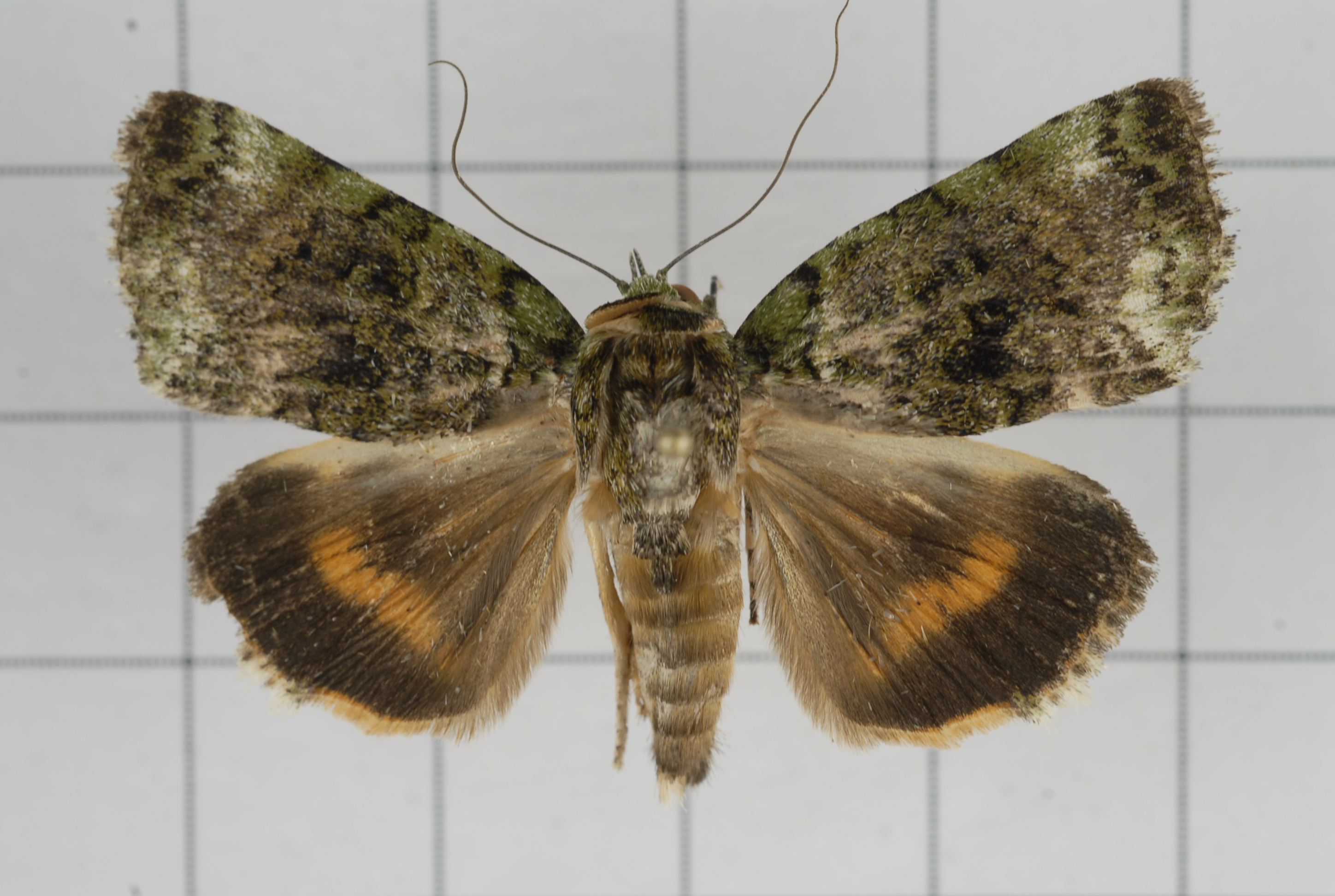

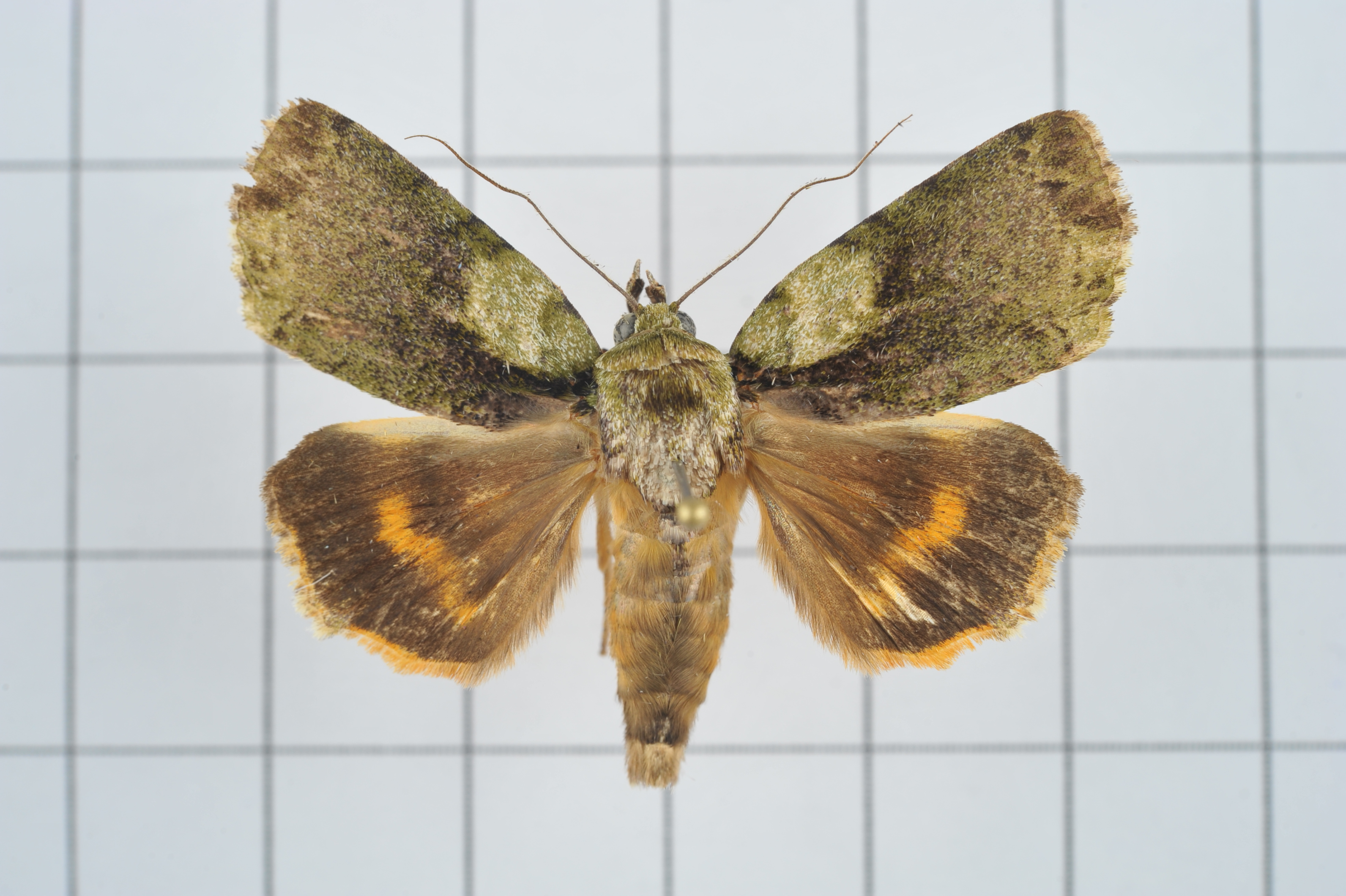

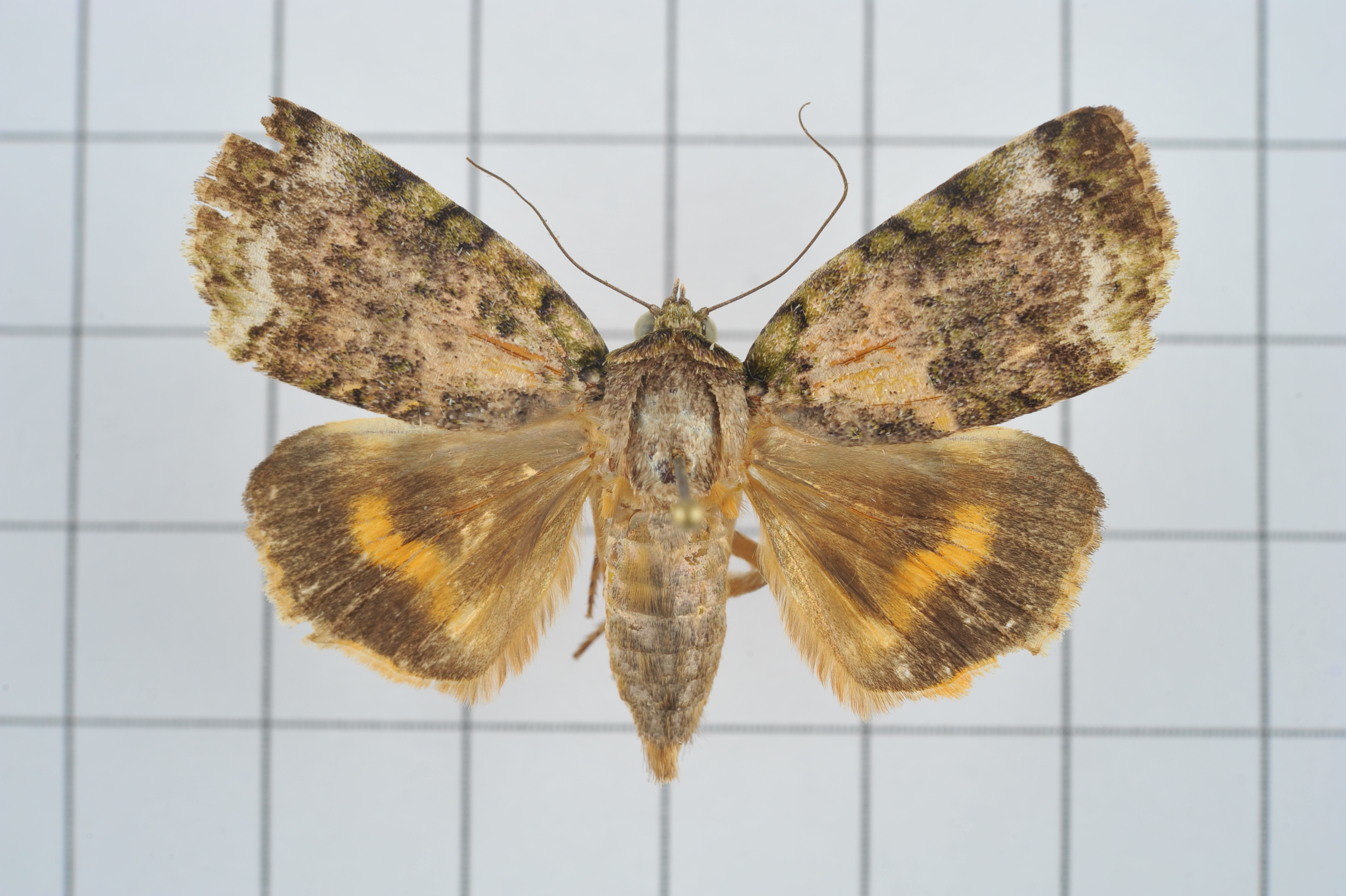
