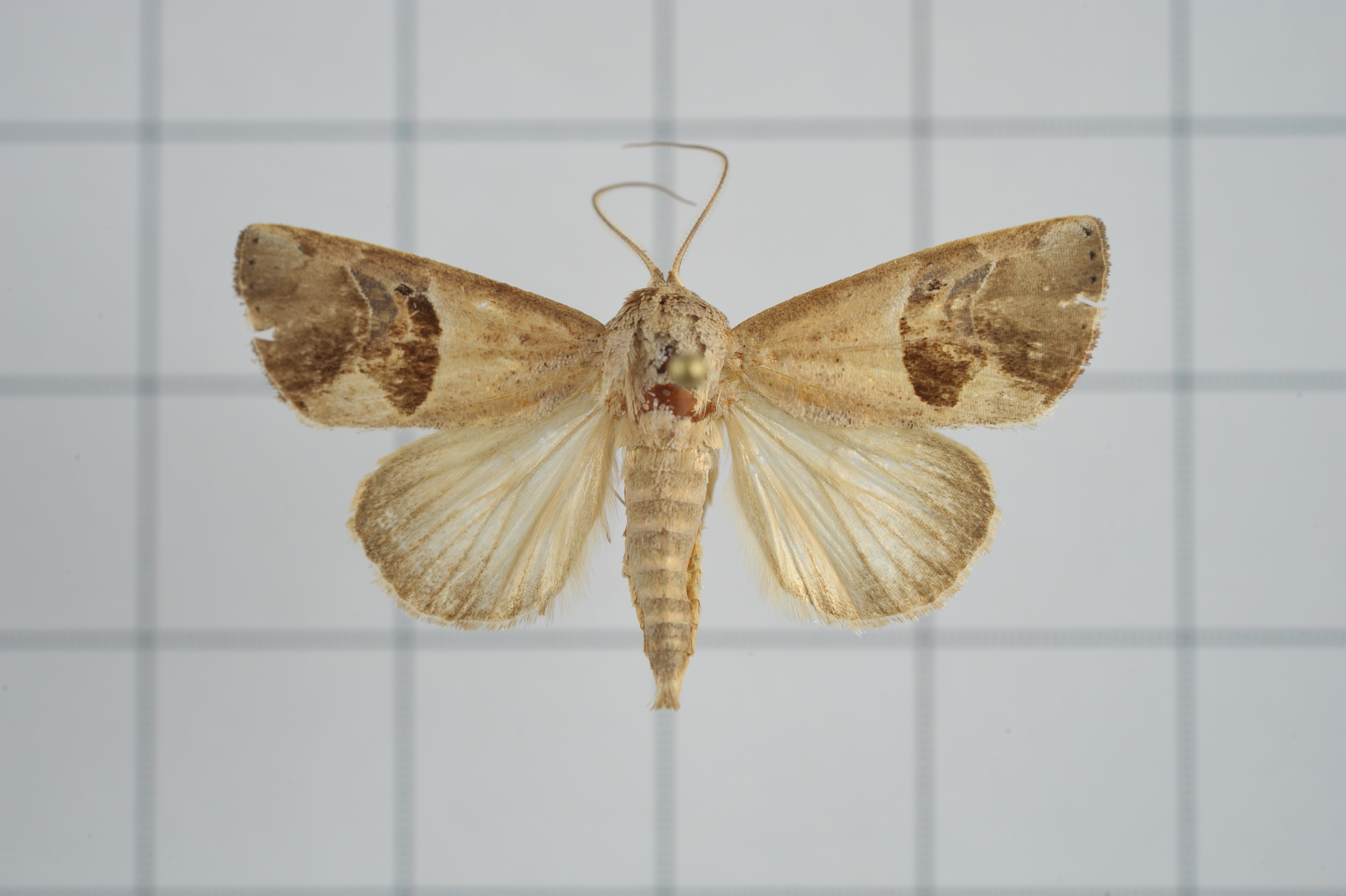

Scientific classification
- Kingdom: Animalia
- Phylum: Arthropoda
- Class: Insecta
- Order: Lepidoptera
- Superfamily: Noctuoidea
- Family: Nolidae
- Genus: Miaromima; Meyrick, 1889

= Miaromima =

Genus of moths

Miaromima is a genus of moths of the family Nolidae. The genus was erected by Edward Meyrick in 1889.

It is now considered by Butterflies and Moths of the World to be a synonym of Westermannia.

== Species ==
- Miaromima aquila (Holloway, 1982)
- Miaromima coelisigna (Hampson, 1895)
- Miaromima columbina (Warren, 1914)
- Miaromima cornucopia (Hampson, 1891)
- Miaromima dinotis (Meyrick, 1889)
- Miaromima naessigi (Kobes, 1989)
- Miaromima pangolina (Holloway, 1982)
