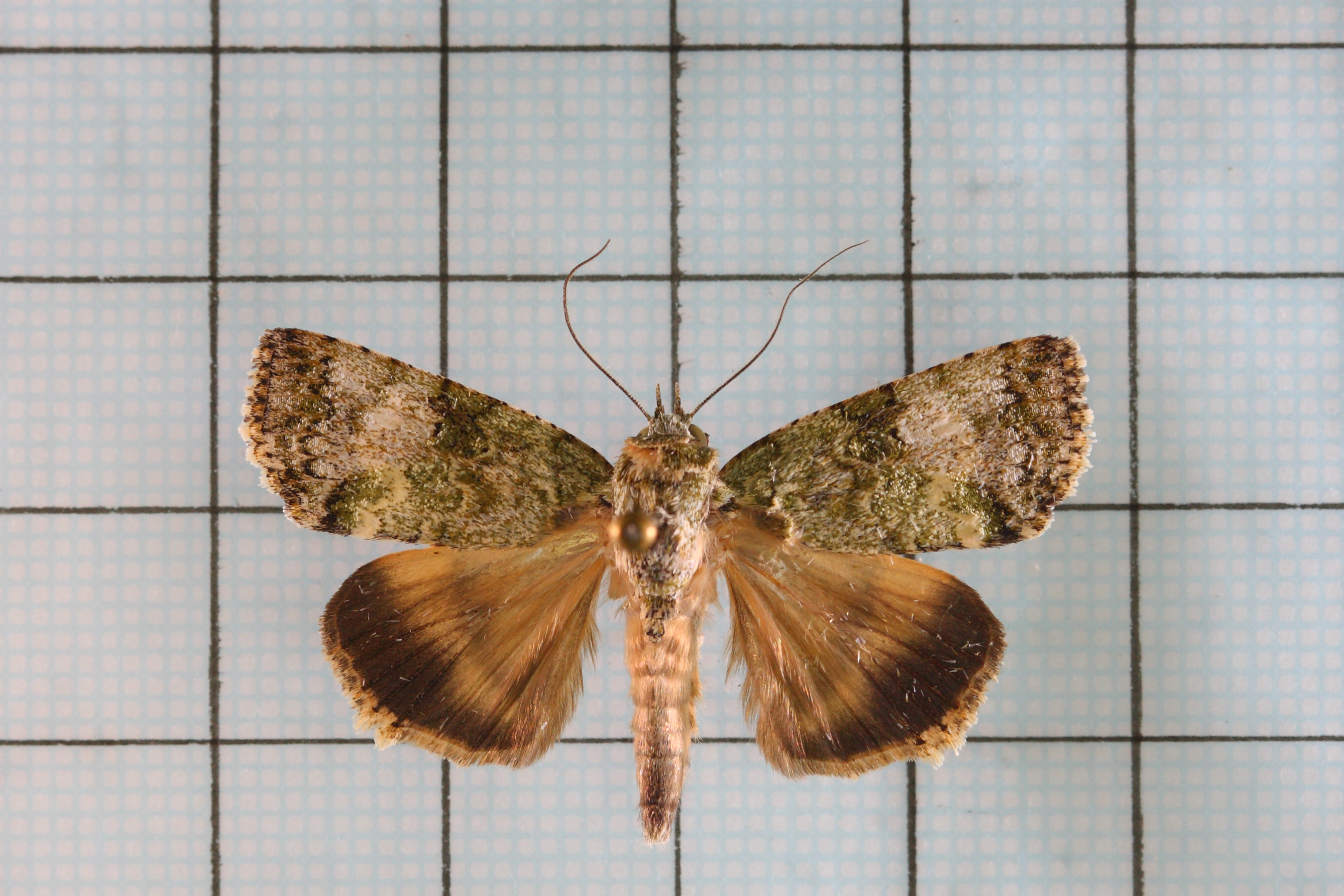

Scientific classification
- Domain: Eukaryota
- Kingdom: Animalia
- Phylum: Arthropoda
- Class: Insecta
- Order: Lepidoptera
- Superfamily: Noctuoidea
- Family: Nolidae
- Genus: Blenina
- Species: B. senex

Binomial name
- Blenina senex (Butler, 1878)

Synonyms
- Dandaca senex Butler, 1878; Dandaca megei Oberthür, 1881

= Blenina senex =

Species of moth

Blenina senex is a moth of the family Nolidae. It is found in Taiwan, Korea and Japan.

The wingspan is 38–43 mm.
