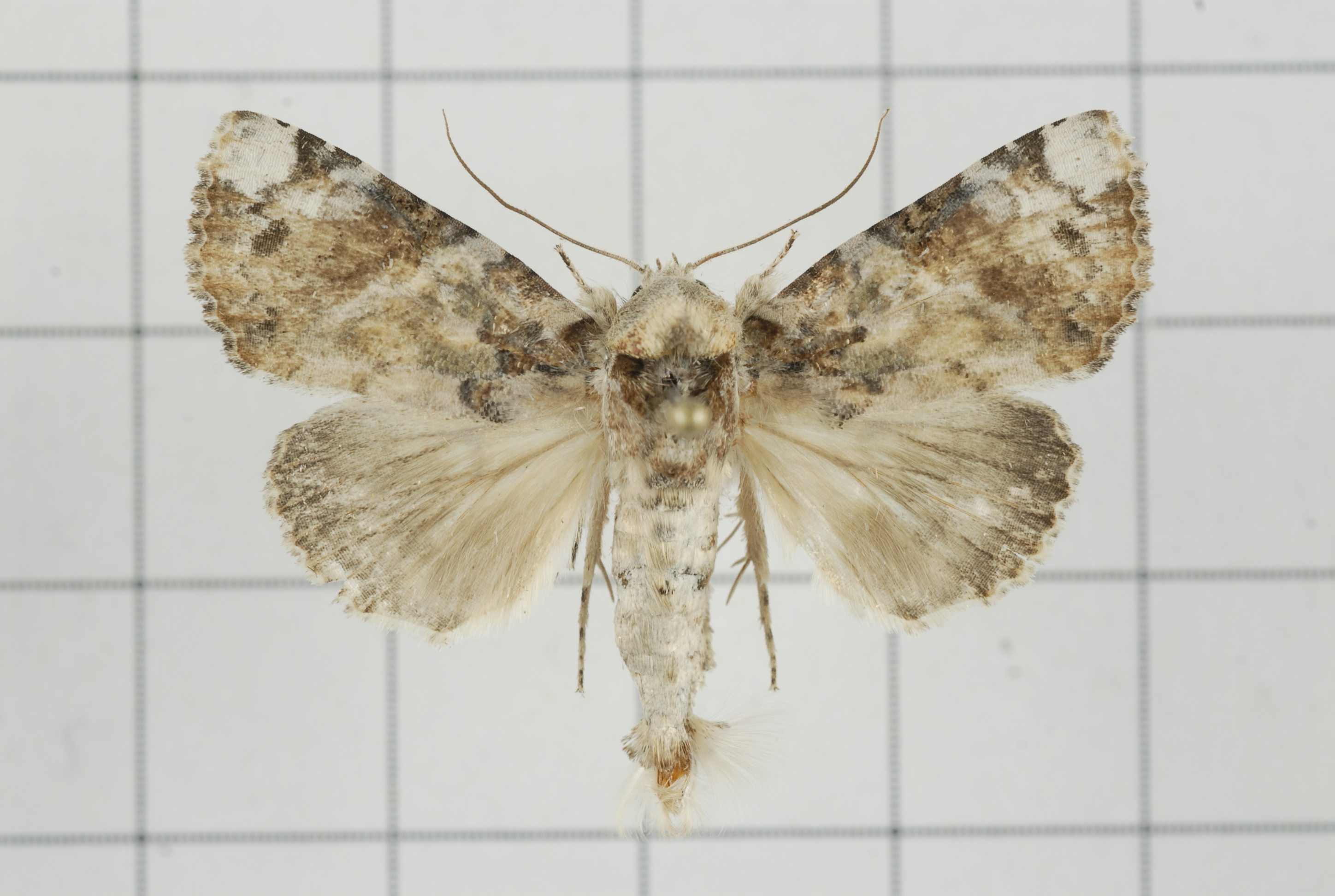
- Male

Scientific classification
- Kingdom: Animalia
- Phylum: Arthropoda
- Class: Insecta
- Order: Lepidoptera
- Superfamily: Noctuoidea
- Family: Nolidae
- Genus: Beana
- Species: B. terminigera

Binomial name
- Beana terminigera (Walker, 1858)

Synonyms
- Felinia? terminigera Walker, 1858; Beana polychroma Walker, 1862; Beana terminigera Walker; Holloway, 1976

= Beana terminigera =

Species of moth

Beana terminigera is a moth of the family Nolidae first described by Francis Walker in 1858. It is found in India, Sri Lanka, Nepal, Thailand, Myanmar, Peninsular Malaysia, Borneo and the Philippines.

== Description ==
Sexes show strong sexual dimorphism. The male has uniform mottled-brown forewings. There is a pale fawn colored circular apical patch triangular basal patch on the forewings of the male. These patches are whitish in the female. The caterpillar is a semi looper. Early instars are dark green and the second instar has some smoky appearance. Late instars are greenish to pinkish brown. Dorsally, abdominal segments show gray and white marbling. The caterpillar lacks the first pair of prolegs. Pupation occurs in a spindle-shaped leaf cell. Pupa lacks a cremaster.

Larval host plants are Quisqualis and Ventilago species.
