= Susmesh Chandroth =

Indian writer

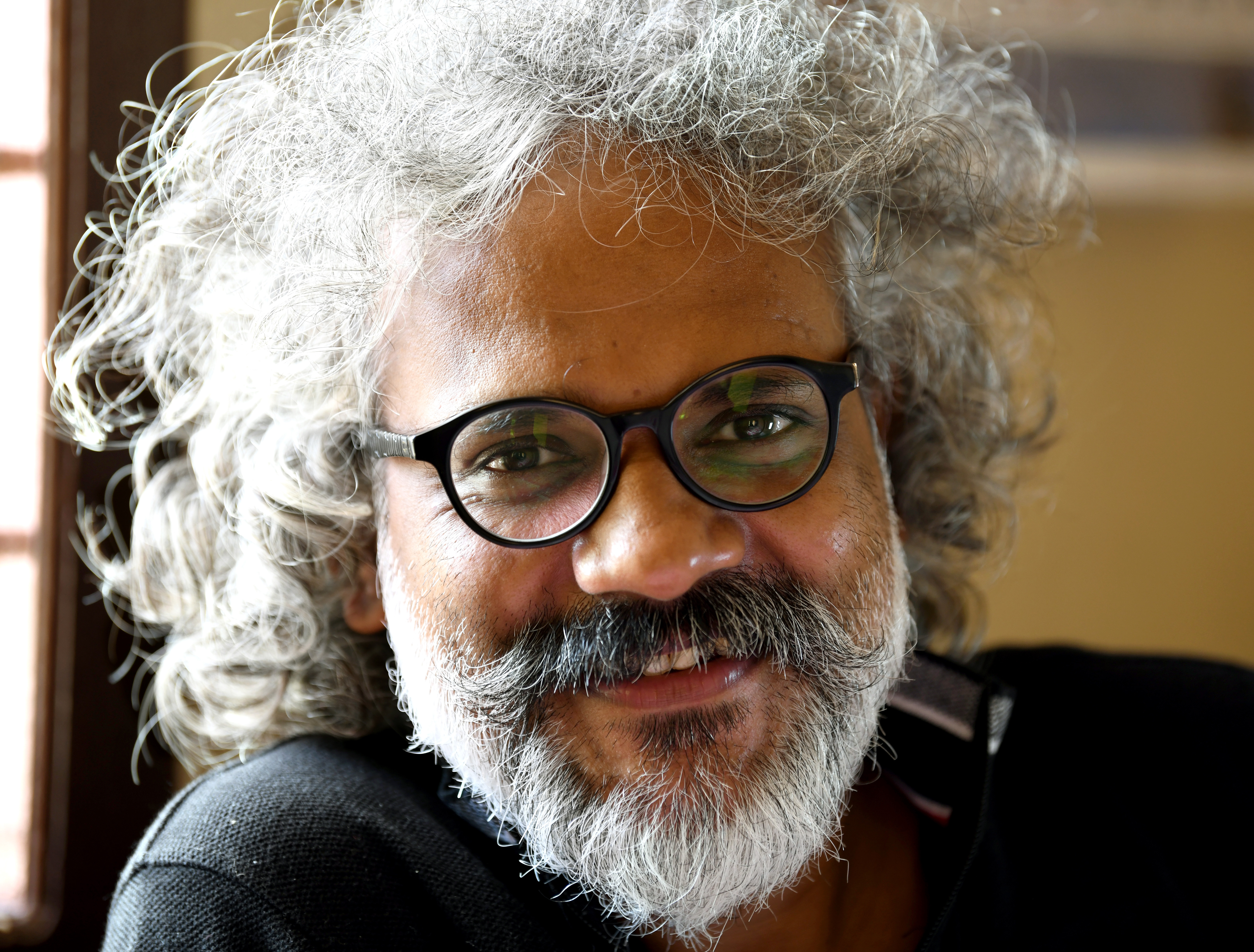
- Born: Kerala, India
- Citizenship: Indian
- Occupation: Writer
- Spouse: Dr.Deepa.V.K
- Writing career
- Language: Malayalam
- Genres: Novel, Short story, essays, screenplay, drama & Children's literature
- Website: Official blog

Susmesh Chandroth (born April 1, 1977) is an Indian writer, who writes in Malayalam. He won the first Yuva Puraskar for Malayalam in 2011 instituted by the Sahitya Akademi, Government of India. Susmesh Chandroth is also involved in the Malayalam film industry. He scripted and directed the feature film Padmini (film) based on the life story of the painter T. K. Padmini in the year 2018.

== Career ==
His first novel D won the Novel Carnival Prize instituted by the DC Books. In 1998, he scripted and directed a documentary in Malayalam named ‘monsoon Camp: A new objectivity’. He scripted the 100 episodes of the series ‘Haritha Bharatham’ (Green India ) in the Malayalam Television Channel Amritha T V. In 2006 he scripted the Malayalam feature film ‘Pakal’ (the Day). The short film in Malayalam ‘Ashupathrikal avashyappudunna Lokam’ (The world which demands hospital) was scripted in 2007. The short film ‘Athira 10 C’ was also scripted by him. He has written the script of the short film ‘Marichavarude Kadal’ (Sea of the dead) directed by the national award winner Priyanandanan.

== List of works ==
=== Novel ===
- D
- 9
- Paper Lodge
- Aathmachaya
- Deshathinte Rathihasam

=== Novella ===
- Marine Canteen
- Nayakanum Nayikayum
- Mamsathinte Ragam Sareeram
- Yanthralochanam

=== Story ===
- Veyil Chayumpol Nadiyoram
- Asupathrikal Avashyapedunna Lokam
- Gandhimargam
- Cocktail City
- Mampazhamanja
- Swarna Mahal
- Marana Vidyalayam
- Sankada Mochanam
- Barcode
- Neernaya
- Ente Makal Olichodum Mumpu
- Vibhavari
- Nithyasameel
- Malineevidhamaya Jeevitham
- Kattakkayam Premakadha
- Harithamohanavum Mattukadhakalum
- Kadha; Susmesh Chandroth
- Kadhaanavakam; Susmesh Chandroth
- Apasarppaka Parabhrahma Moorthy

=== Children's literature ===
- Amudakuttiyude Chithrapradarsanam
- Koohu Gramathile Kuzhappakkaran

=== Essay ===
- Asadharana Ormakalum Asadharana Anubhavangalum
- Decemberile kilimuttakal (Blog Notes)
- Amsham deshathinte Suvisesham
- Samasthadesham.com
- Subhashchandrabosinu Nere Ippol aarum nokkarilla

=== Screenplay ===
- Pakal (Feature film)
- Asupathrikal Avashyapedunna Lokam (Short film)
- Athira 10 C (Short film)
- Marichavarude Kadal (Short film)
- Padmini (Feature film)

=== Drama ===
- Mathangavithukalude vilapam
- Aani Daivam

== Awards ==
- 2011 Yuva Puraskar Sahitya Akademi Yuva Puraskar, is a literary honor in India which Sahitya Akademi, India's National Academy of Letters.
- 2004: DC Books Novel Carnival Award – D
- 2008: Edasseri Award – Marana Vidyalayam
- 2010: Ankanam E. P. Sushma Endowment Award
- 2010: Kerala Sahitya Akademi Geetha Hiranyan Endowment – Swarnamahal
- 2010: K.A. Kodungalloor Award – Marana Vidyalayam
- 2011: Sahitya Akademi Yuva Puraskar – Marana Vidyalayam
- 2011: Thoppil Ravi Memorial Literary Award – Marana Vidyalayam
- 2011: Kerala State Television Award for Best Screenplay – Athira 10 C
- 2012: Cherukad Award – Barcode
- 2013: C. V. Sreeraman Smrithi Award – Barcode
- 2013: Abu Dhabi Sakthi Award – Barcode
- 2013: T. V. Kochubava Story Award – Marana Vidyalayam
- 2014: Mundoor Krishnankutty Award – Marana Vidyalayam

== Stories ==
- Susmesh Chandroth. "മത്തങ്ങാ വിത്തുകളുടെ വിലാപം" [Mathanga Vithukalude Vilapam]. Madhyamam (in Malayalam).
- Susmesh Chandroth. "ഒരേ ചോര" [Ore Chora]. Madhyamam (in Malayalam).
- Susmesh Chandroth (19 April 2015). "സംഹിതയുടെ കത്ത്" [Samhithayude Kathu] (PDF). Deshabhimani (in Malayalam).

Memoirs

- Susmesh Chandroth (January 2007). "ഓര്‍മ്മകളുടെ കാവ്യനീതി" [Ormakalude Kavyaneethi]. Chintha (in Malayalam). Archived from the original on 21 July 2015.

Essays

- Collection of 7 essays written in Keraleeyam
- Susmesh Chandroth. "അരവിന്ദന്‍ വരഞ്ഞെഴുതിയ സാമൂഹികപാഠം" [Aravindan Varanjezhuthiya Samoohikapadam]. Madhyamam (in Malayalam).
