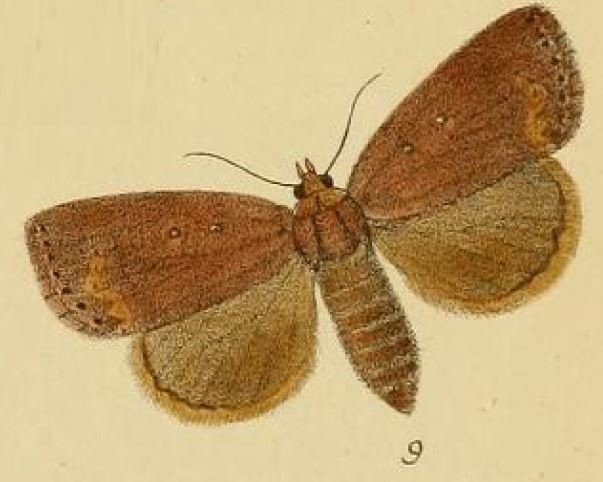
- Leocyma fustina

Scientific classification
- Kingdom: Animalia
- Phylum: Arthropoda
- Class: Insecta
- Order: Lepidoptera
- Superfamily: Noctuoidea
- Family: Nolidae
- Subfamily: Chloephorinae
- Genus: Leocyma; Guenée, 1852

Synonyms
- Thiganusa Walker, 1865

= Leocyma =

Genus of moths

Leocyma is a genus of moths in the family Nolidae first described by Achille Guenée in 1852.

== Description ==
The eyes are naked and lack lashes. The proboscis is well developed. Palpi are upturned, reaching the vertex of the head, and are smoothly scaled. The male's antennae are simple. The thorax and abdomen are smoothly scaled and tuftless. The tibia is spineless. Forewings have non-crenulate cilia.

== Species ==
Some species of this genus are:

- Leocyma appollinis Guenée, 1852
- Leocyma camilla (Druce, 1887)
- Leocyma candace Fawcett, 1916
- Leocyma congoensis Holland, 1920
- Leocyma discophora Hampson, 1912
- Leocyma fustina Schaus, 1893
- Leocyma vates Saalmüller, 1891
