= Euglyphia =

Euglyphia can refer to:

- Euglyphia (protist), a superorder of protists in the phylum Cercozoa
- Diphthera (moth), a genus of moths with the alternative scientific name Euglyphia
