= Afrida exegens =

Scientific classification
- Kingdom: Animalia
- Phylum: Arthropoda
- Class: Insecta
- Order: Lepidoptera
- Superfamily: Noctuoidea
- Family: Nolidae
- Genus: Afrida
- Species: A. exegens

Binomial name
- Afrida exegens Dyar, 1922

Species of moth

Afrida exegens is a species of nolid moth in the family Nolidae. It is found in North America.

The MONA or Hodges number for Afrida exegens is 8103.1.
