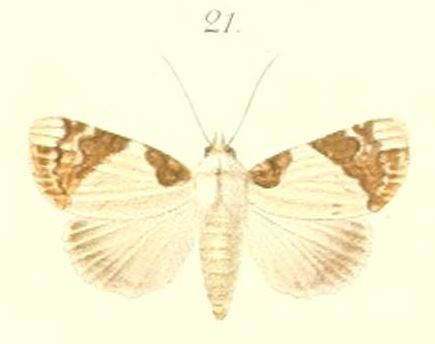

Scientific classification
- Domain: Eukaryota
- Kingdom: Animalia
- Phylum: Arthropoda
- Class: Insecta
- Order: Lepidoptera
- Superfamily: Noctuoidea
- Family: Nolidae
- Genus: Beana
- Species: B. opala

Binomial name
- Beana opala (Pagenstecher, 1900)

Synonyms
- Polydesma opala Pagenstecher, 1900

= Beana opala =

Species of moth

Beana opala is a moth of the family Nolidae first described by Pagenstecher in 1900. It is found on the Bismarck Archipelago and Papua New Guinea.
