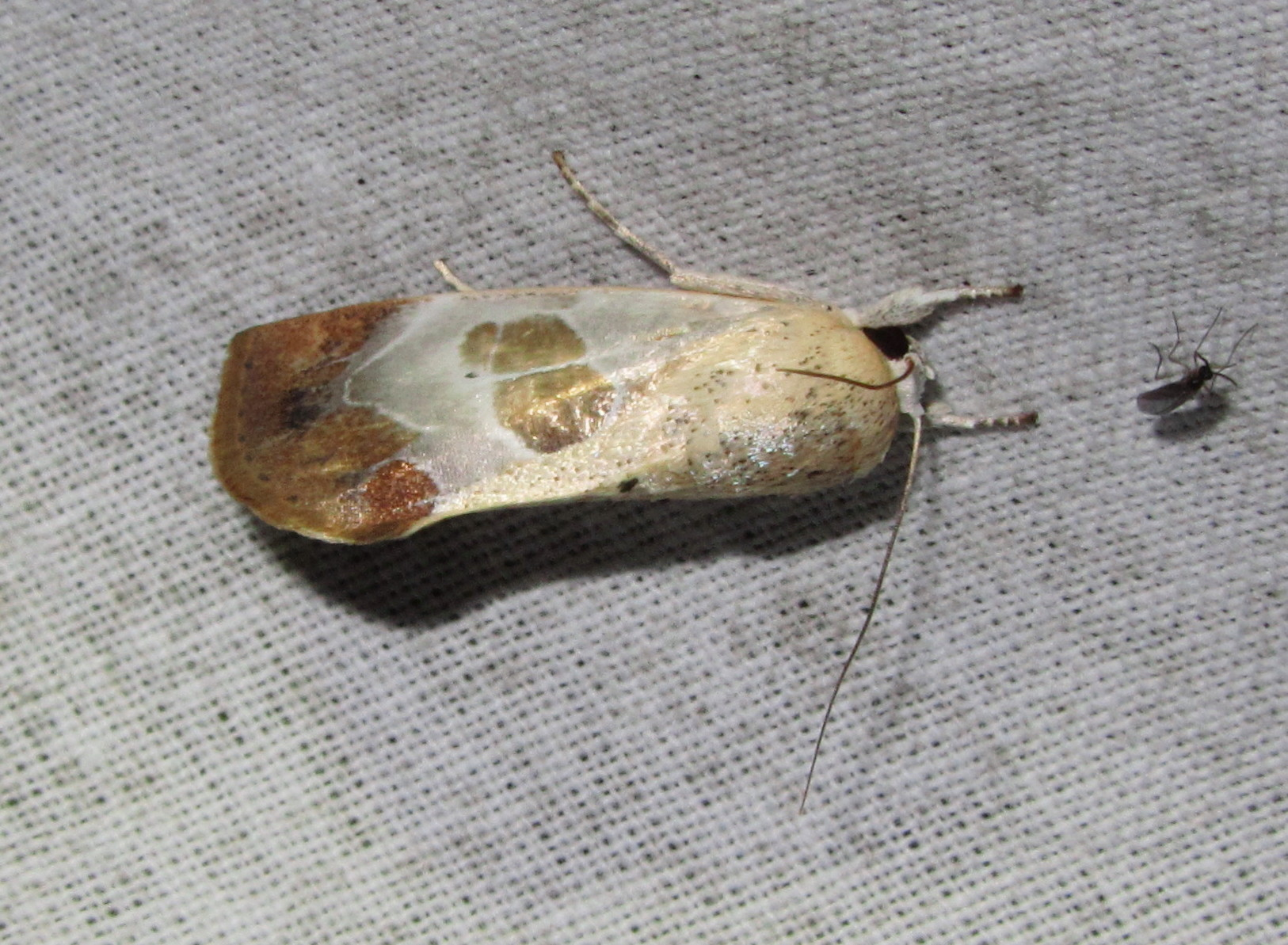

Scientific classification
- Kingdom: Animalia
- Phylum: Arthropoda
- Class: Insecta
- Order: Lepidoptera
- Superfamily: Noctuoidea
- Family: Nolidae
- Genus: Westermannia
- Species: W. superba

Binomial name
- Westermannia superba Hübner, 1823

Synonyms
- Plusiodes westermannii Guenée, 1852; Vestermannia gloriosa Hampson, 1912; Westermannia gloriosa

= Westermannia superba =

Species of moth

Westermannia superba is a moth of the family Nolidae first described by Jacob Hübner in 1823. It is found on New Guinea, Australia (Queensland), India, Sri Lanka, Singapore and on Sumatra, Borneo and Palawan.

== Description ==
Its wingspan is about 36 mm. Head pure white. Thorax and abdomen yellowish white. Forewings pale silvery brown. Basal costal area and the broad postmedial curved band whitish. These two white areas conjoined at costa, and by the discocellulars and median nervure being white. Hindwings pale, suffused with fuscous towards outer margin. Larva pale olive-green, and thickly spotted with yellow. There is a yellow dorsal line can be seen on each segment.

The larvae feed on Lagerstroemia, Terminalia and Anogeissus species.
