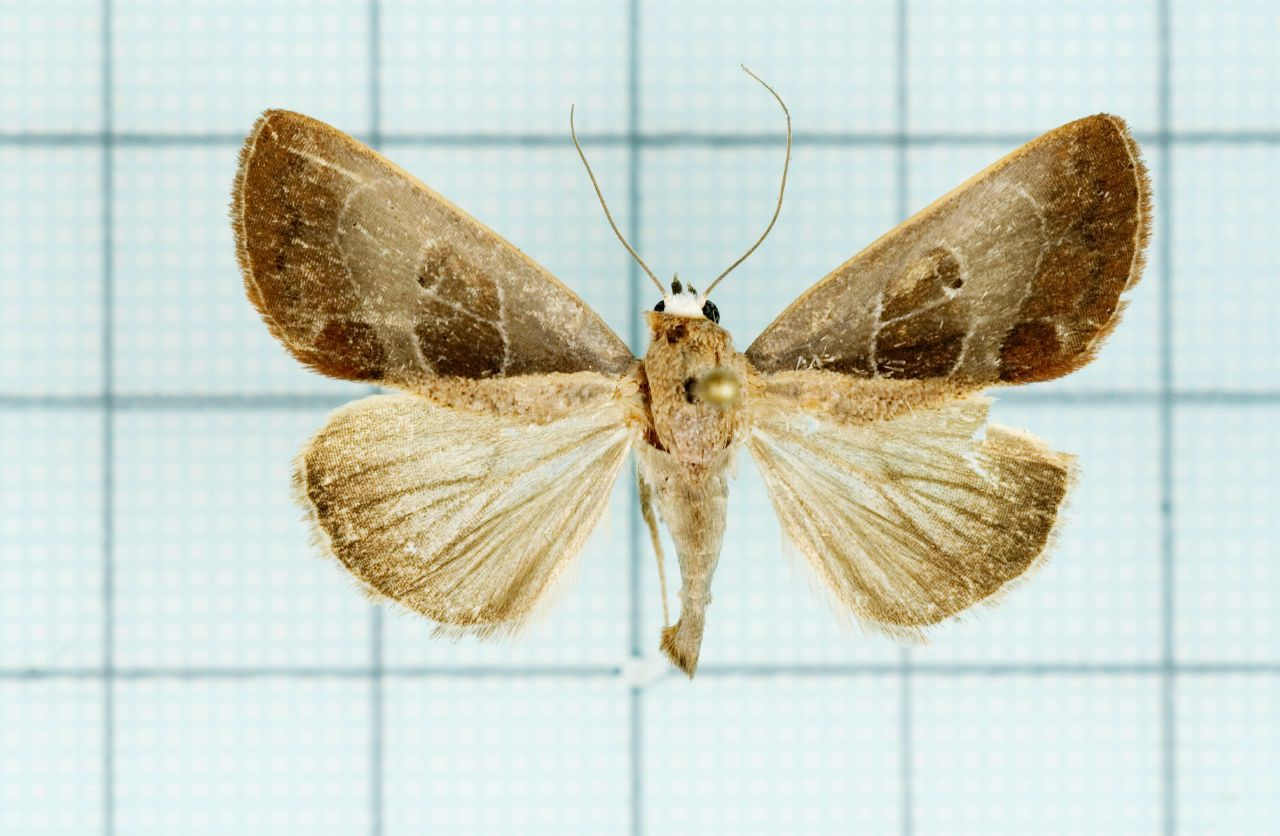

Scientific classification
- Kingdom: Animalia
- Phylum: Arthropoda
- Class: Insecta
- Order: Lepidoptera
- Superfamily: Noctuoidea
- Family: Nolidae
- Genus: Westermannia
- Species: W. elliptica

Binomial name
- Westermannia elliptica Bryk, 1913

Synonyms
- Westermannia obscura Wileman, 1914; Iragaodes albiceps Matsumura, 1931; Westermannia rajata Kobes, 1988

= Westermannia elliptica =

Species of moth

Westermannia elliptica is a species of moth of the family Nolidae first described by Felix Bryk in 1913. It is found in Taiwan, Borneo, Peninsular Malaysia and Sumatra.

== Subspecies ==
- Westermannia elliptica elliptica (Taiwan)
- Westermannia elliptica rajata Kobes, 1988 (Borneo, Peninsular Malaysia, Sumatra)
