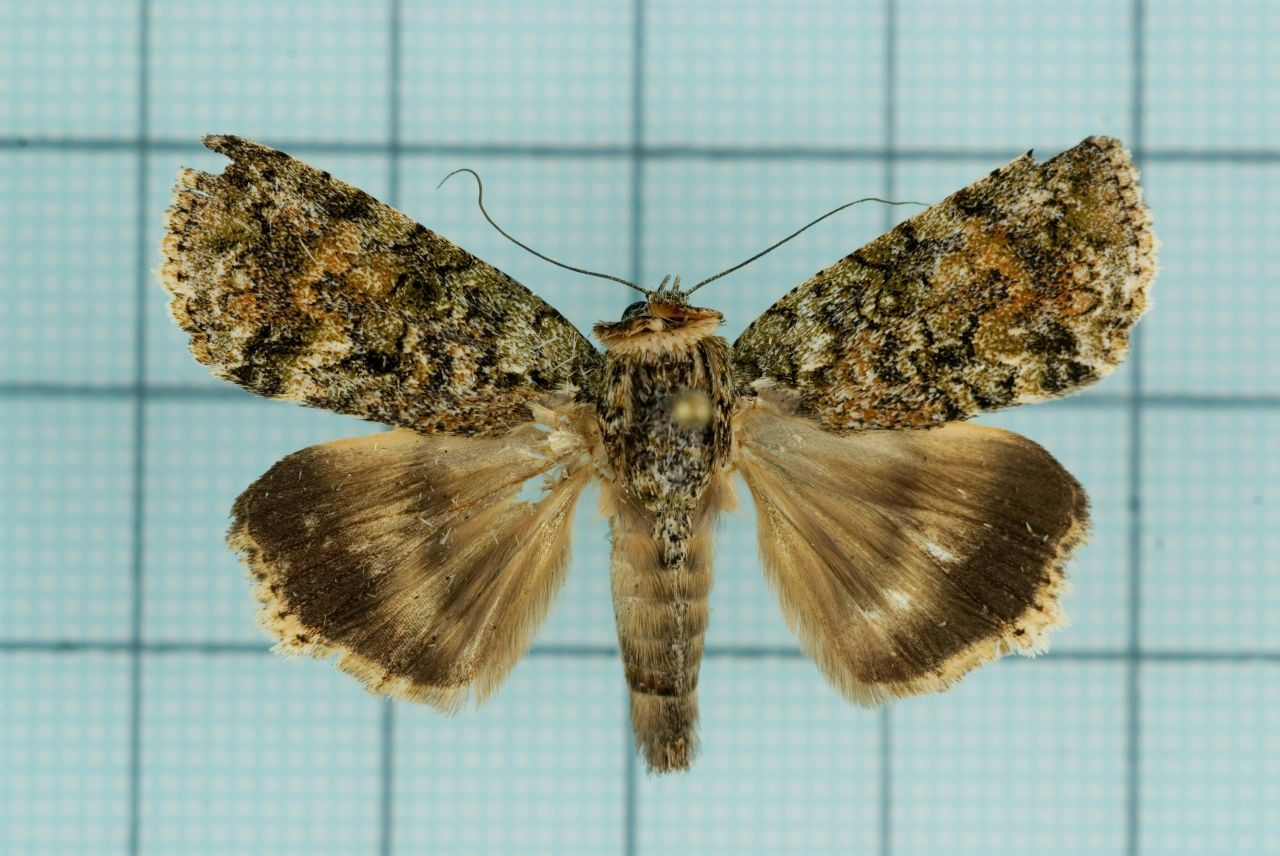

Scientific classification
- Domain: Eukaryota
- Kingdom: Animalia
- Phylum: Arthropoda
- Class: Insecta
- Order: Lepidoptera
- Superfamily: Noctuoidea
- Family: Nolidae
- Genus: Blenina
- Species: B. quinaria

Binomial name
- Blenina quinaria Moore, 1882

Synonyms
- Blenina quinaria ab. aperta Warren, 1913; Blenina quinaria ab. irrorata Warren, 1913; Blenina quinaria ab. nigrosignata Warren, 1913; Blenina quinaria ab. rufitincta Warren, 1913; Blenina quinaria ab. semipallens Warren, 1913

= Blenina quinaria =

Species of moth

Blenina quinaria is a moth of the family Nolidae first described by Frederic Moore in 1882. It is found in the north-eastern Himalayas of India, western China, Vietnam, Taiwan, Peninsular Malaysia, Borneo, the Philippines and Japan (Kyushu: Oita, Kumamoto).

The wingspan is 35–40 mm.

The larvae feed on Pterocarya species.
