= Charan (disambiguation) =

Charan may refer to:

- Charan, a caste in India
- Charan, Iran (disambiguation) - any of several places in Iran
- The Charan subgroup of the Banjara people
- Brohi Charan, a social group in Pakistan
- The biblical place Haran

== See also ==
- Charanam, composition in Indian classical music
- Charanam, Indian band
- Charan Singh (disambiguation)
