= Kerala (disambiguation) =

Kerala, officially Keralam, is a state on the Malabar Coast of southern India.

Kerala may also refer to:

- Kerala (moth), a genus of moths in the family Nolidae
- Kerala Blasters FC, an Indian professional football club
- F.C. Kerala, an Indian professional football club
- Kerala, a village in Afghanistan and the site of the 1979 Kerala massacre
- Kerala J. Snyder, American musicologist
- "Kerala", a song by Bonobo from the 2017 album Migration
- Kerala Circuit, a Hindi film distribution circuit in Kerala

== See also ==
- Kerala Varma (disambiguation)
- Kairali (disambiguation)
- Keraleeyam (disambiguation)
- Chera (disambiguation)
  - Chera dynasty, or Cheralam/Keralam, ancient Indian dynasty that ruled over parts of the present-day states of Kerala and Tamil, eponym of the state
- Karala, a town in Guinea
