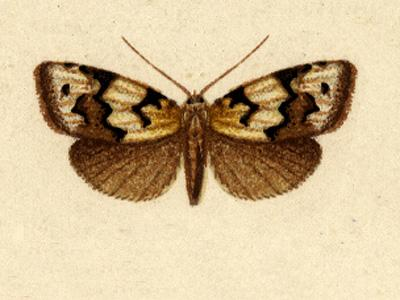

Scientific classification
- Kingdom: Animalia
- Phylum: Arthropoda
- Class: Insecta
- Order: Lepidoptera
- Superfamily: Noctuoidea
- Family: Nolidae
- Genus: Afrida
- Species: A. mesomelaena

Binomial name
- Afrida mesomelaena Hampson, 1914

= Afrida mesomelaena =

Species of moth

Afrida mesomelaena is a moth of the family Nolidae. It is found in Jamaica.
