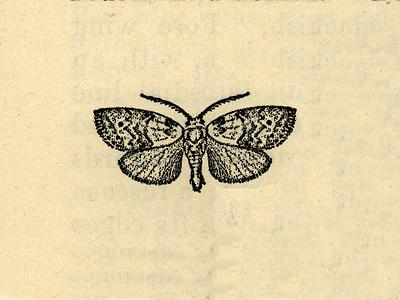

Scientific classification
- Domain: Eukaryota
- Kingdom: Animalia
- Phylum: Arthropoda
- Class: Insecta
- Order: Lepidoptera
- Superfamily: Noctuoidea
- Family: Nolidae
- Genus: Afrida
- Species: A. tortriciformis

Binomial name
- Afrida tortriciformis Möschler, 1886

= Afrida tortriciformis =

Species of moth

Afrida tortriciformis is a moth of the family Nolidae and the Afrida genus. It is found in Jamaica. It was identified in 1886 by Heinrich Benno Möschler.
