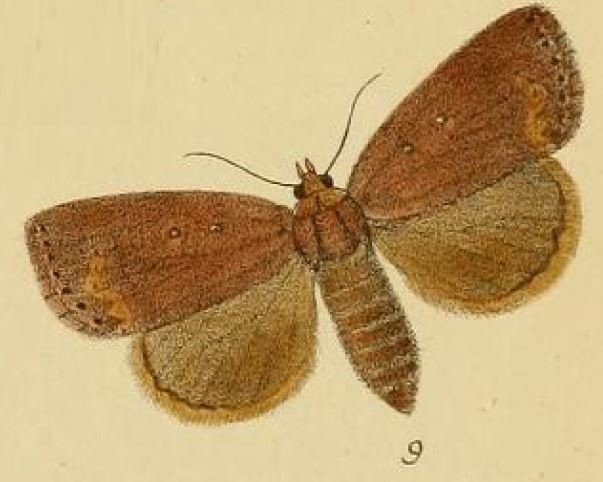

Scientific classification
- Domain: Eukaryota
- Kingdom: Animalia
- Phylum: Arthropoda
- Class: Insecta
- Order: Lepidoptera
- Superfamily: Noctuoidea
- Family: Nolidae
- Genus: Leocyma
- Species: L. fustina

Binomial name
- Leocyma fustina Schaus, 1893

= Leocyma fustina =

Species of moth

Leocyma fustina is a moth of the family Nolidae. It is found in Sierra Leone.
