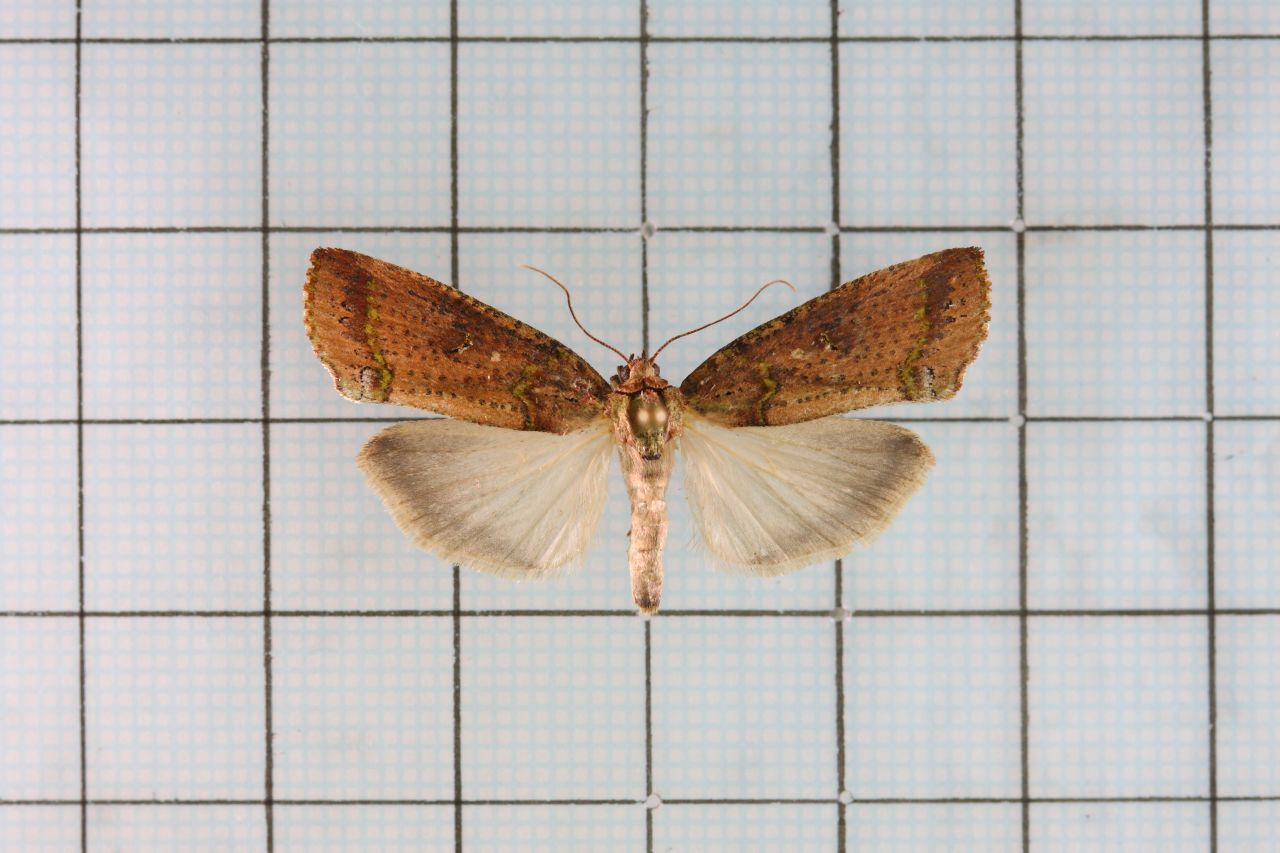

Scientific classification
- Kingdom: Animalia
- Phylum: Arthropoda
- Class: Insecta
- Order: Lepidoptera
- Superfamily: Noctuoidea
- Family: Nolidae
- Genus: Kerala
- Species: K. lentiginosa

Binomial name
- Kerala lentiginosa Wileman, 1914

= Kerala lentiginosa =

Species of moth

Kerala lentiginosa is a species of moth of the family Nolidae. It is found in Taiwan.

The wingspan is 31–38 mm.
