= Cheras (disambiguation) =

Cheras usually refers to the Chera dynasty, an Indian dynasty that ruled over parts of the present-day states of Kerala and Tamil Nadu.

Cheras may also refer to:

- Cheras, Kuala Lumpur, a suburb of Kuala Lumpur, Malaysia
- Cheras (federal constituency), represented in the Dewan Rakyat
- Poliklinik Cheras, a female governmental hospital in Kuala Lumpur
- Balakong, a township that stretches from Kuala Lumpur to Kajang in Selangor, Malaysia
- Cheras LRT station, an at-grade rapid transit station situated near and named after the Kuala Lumpur township of Cheras, Kuala Lumpur, Malaysia
- Cheras Highway, a major highway in Kuala Lumpur, Malaysia

== See also ==
- Chera (disambiguation)
