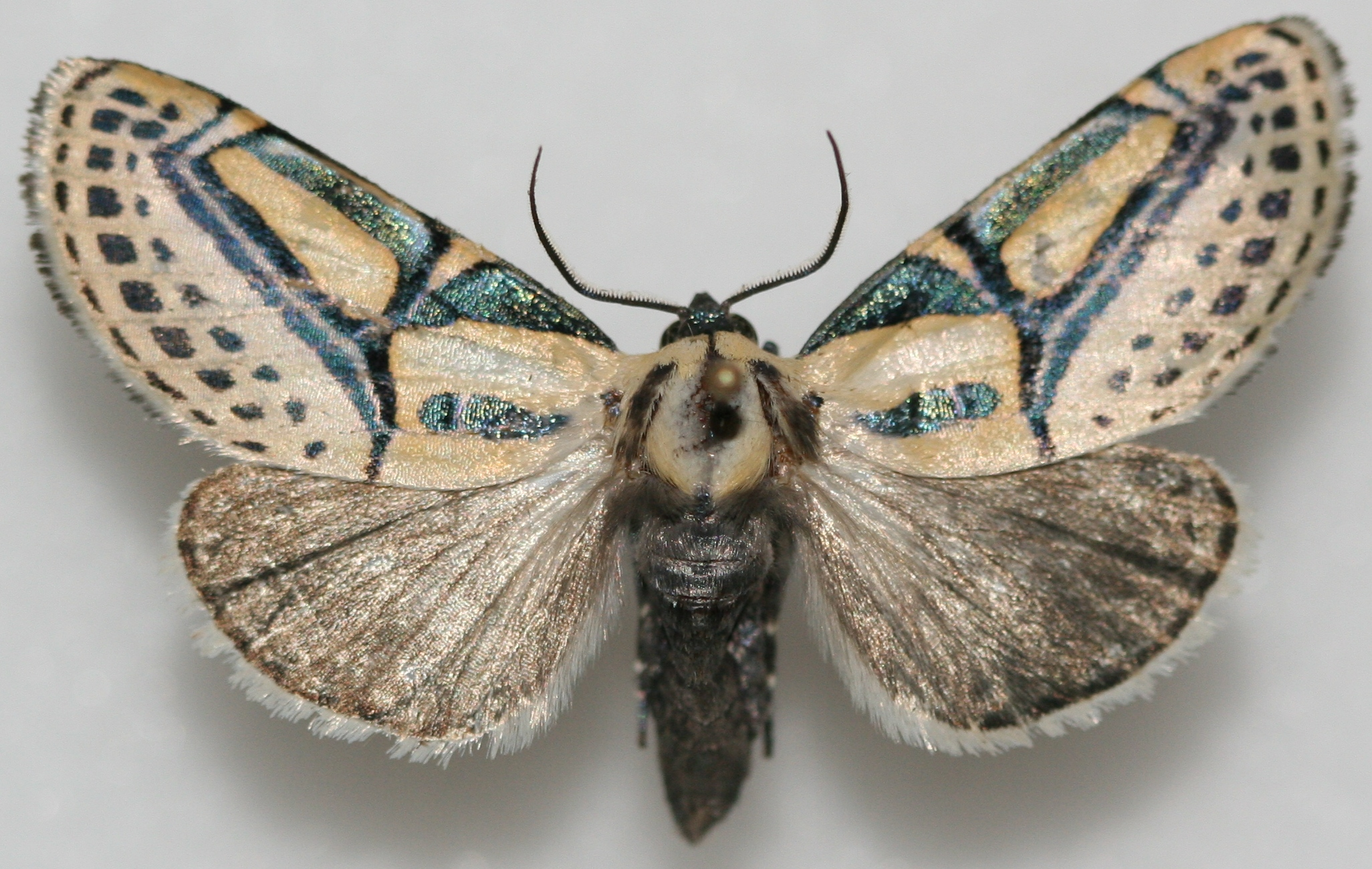

Scientific classification
- Kingdom: Animalia
- Phylum: Arthropoda
- Clade: Pancrustacea
- Class: Insecta
- Order: Lepidoptera
- Superfamily: Noctuoidea
- Family: Nolidae
- Genus: Diphthera
- Species: D. festiva

Binomial name
- Diphthera festiva (Fabricius, 1775)

Synonyms
- Bombyx festiva Fabricius, 1775; Phalaena hieroglyphica Cramer, 1777; Diphthera elegans Hübner, 1806; Noropsis fastuosa Guenée, 1852; Noropsis hydroglyphica Cramer, 1777

= Diphthera festiva =

Hieroglyphic moth

Species of moth

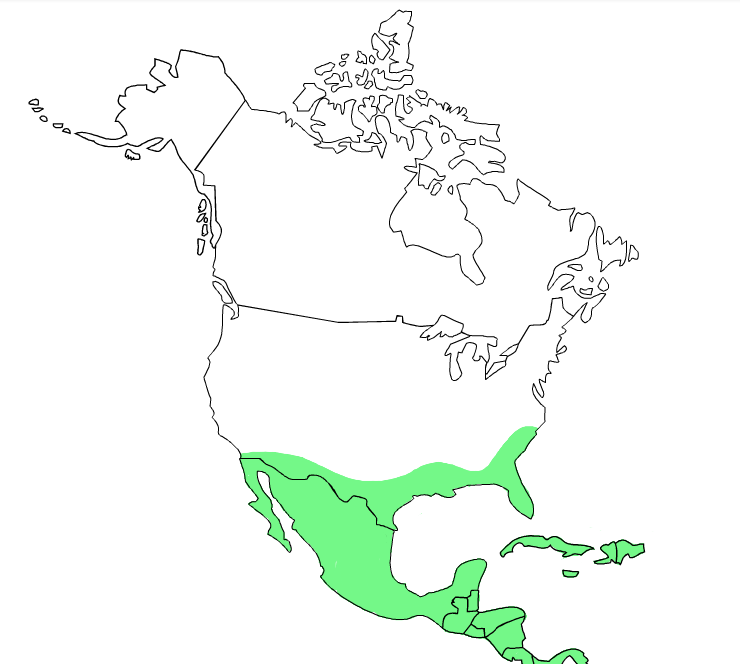
Range map of D. festiva in North America

Diphthera festiva, the hieroglyphic moth, is a species of moth in the family Nolidae and is the only moth in its subfamily Diphtherinae. It is found in the tropical and subtropical areas of South America (as far south as Bolivia and Brazil), Central America, North America, and the Caribbean. In North America, the species has a southeastern distribution from South Carolina west to Texas along the Gulf Coast. Strays have been recorded as far north as Michigan and Missouri. The wingspan is 37–48 mm (1.5–1.9 in). This species is occasionally considered a pest on soybeans. It was described by Johan Christian Fabricius in 1775.

== Identification ==
The hieroglyphic moth has light yellow-orange forewings with distinctive blue-black metallic lines and three rows of metallic dots parallel to the exterior margin. The hindwing is black with white fringe and the pronotum is yellow orange with three black stripes. The abdomen, legs, and filiform (threadlike) antennae are black. Males and females are alike, except for one noticeable sexual dimorphism: females have four tibial spurs on their hind legs, while males have only two.

The pupae are dark brown to black and around 1.7 cm long. They can be attached to trees or stems in rounded cocoons made of silk and small pieces of plant matter. The cocoons have a vertical exit slit characteristic of the family Nolidae.

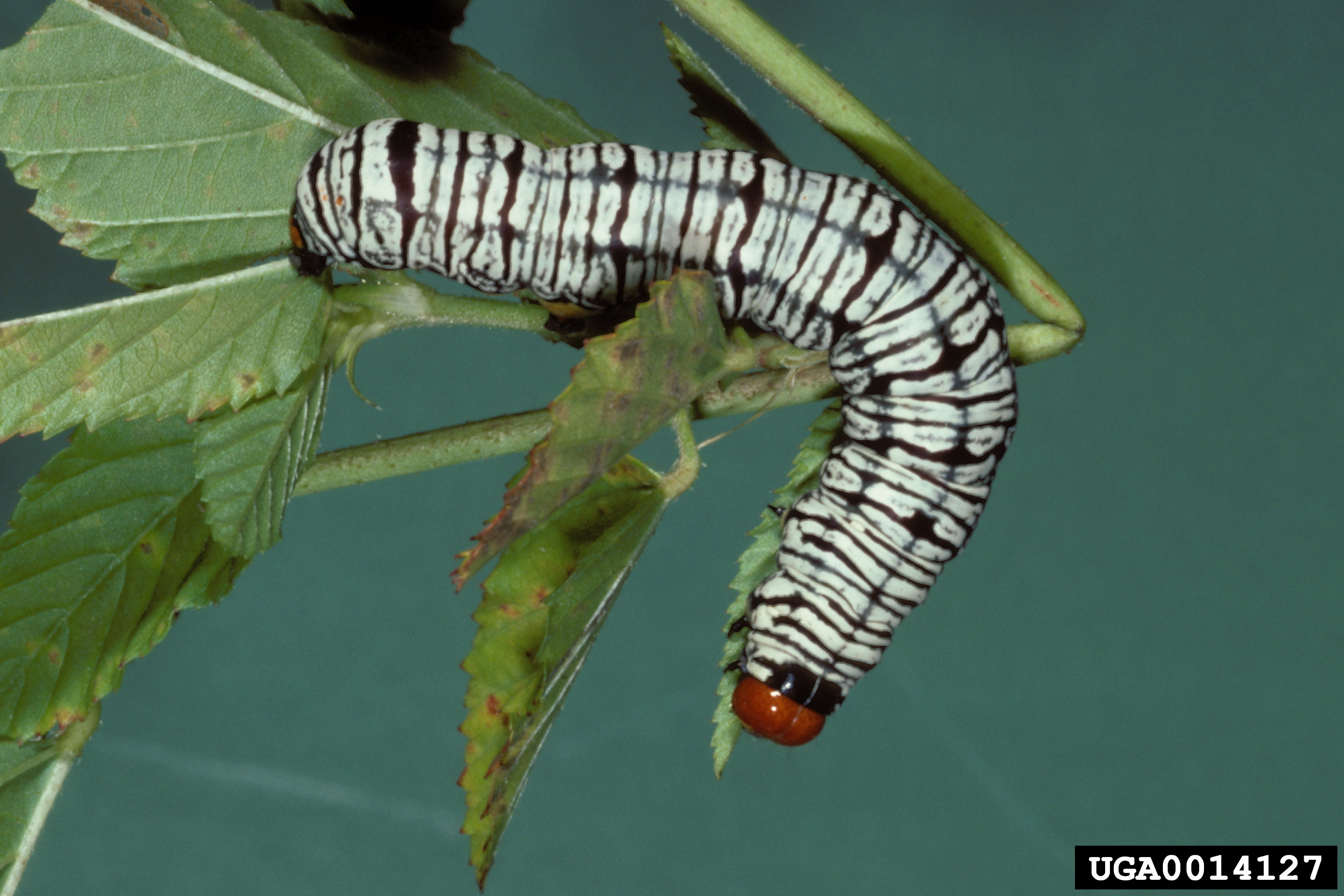
Caterpillar

The caterpillar has a red-orange head and anal plate and a white body with black rings. There are three or four incomplete black rings per segment that end before the cream-colored underside. The spiracles look like black dots and are located in between the black rings. On some caterpillars, there are also black stripes down the length of the body. The true legs and prolegs are black, and there is an orange spot above the prolegs on each side. The larvae feed in groups and their striking patterns may be aposematic, as reported by Becker and Miller (2002): "One male was tossed towards a gray kingbird, Tyrannus dominicensis (Gmelin), who caught it in the air, returned to its perch, tried to swallow the moth, then spit it out and cleaned its beak against the branch."

Teran (1980) documented one parasitoid wasp of the family Chalcididae on a wild D. festiva caterpillar in Venezuela.

The caterpillars feed mainly on Sterculiaceae, Fabaceae and Malvaceae species and can reach up to 4.5 cm in length.

== Larval host plants ==
Host plant records include:

- Sterculiaceae:
  - Melochia corchorifolia - chocolateweed
  - Melochia pyrimidata - pyramid flower
  - Melochia tomentosa - teabush
  - Waltheria indica - sleepy morning
- Fabaceae:
  - Lespedeza thunbergii - Thunberg's bushclover
  - Glycine max - soybean
  - Schrankia portoricensis
- Malvaceae:
  - Malvastrum spicatum
  - Sida sp.

Other species mentioned in the literature (description from Dunford and Barbara 2008): Phyllanthus latifolius (Euphorbiaceae), Boerhaavia diffusa (Nyctaginaceae), Morongia leptoclada (Mimosaceae), Carya sp. (Juglandaceae), Ipomoea batatas (Convolvulaceae), Cocos sp. (Arecaceae), Casuarina equisetifolia (Casuarinaceae), Corchorus hirsutus (Tiliaceae), and Lippia alba (Lamiaceae), and Solanum sp. (Solanaceae).

== Taxonomy ==
Formerly assigned to the family Noctuidae by Fibiger and Lafontaine (2005), recent phylogenetic and morphological analysis revealed that the hieroglyphic moth is more closely related to moths in the family Nolidae. In addition to genetic similarity, D. festiva shares the main characteristic that unites nolids: a rounded silk cocoon with plant matter woven in and a vertical exit slit. The hieroglyphic moth is now placed in its own subfamily, Diphtherinae, which is the sister group to the rest of the subfamilies within Nolidae.
