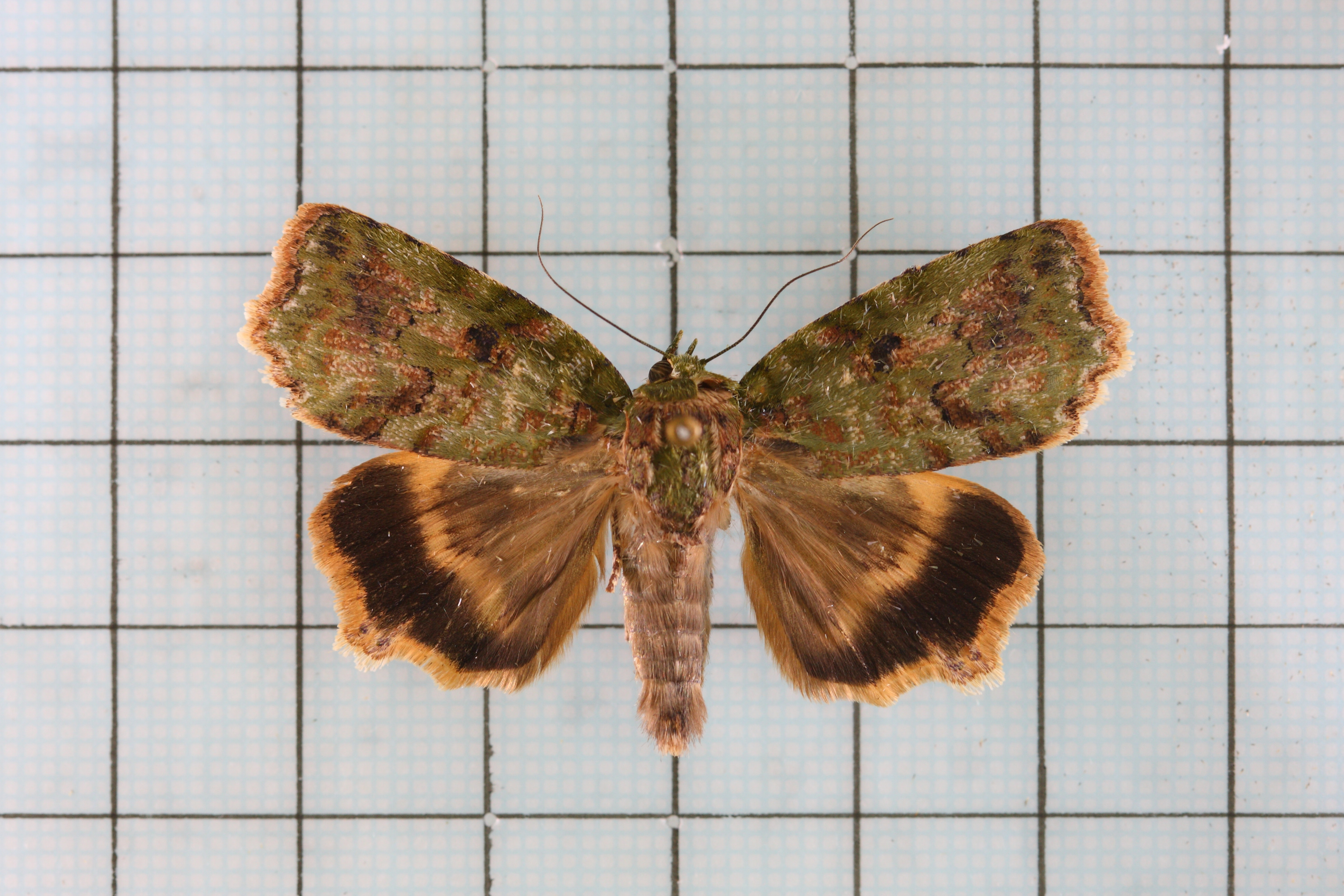

Scientific classification
- Domain: Eukaryota
- Kingdom: Animalia
- Phylum: Arthropoda
- Class: Insecta
- Order: Lepidoptera
- Superfamily: Noctuoidea
- Family: Nolidae
- Genus: Blenina
- Species: B. angulipennis

Binomial name
- Blenina angulipennis (Moore, 1882)

Synonyms
- Amrella angulipennis Moore, 1882

= Blenina angulipennis =

Species of moth

Blenina angulipennis is a moth of the family Nolidae first described by Frederic Moore in 1882. It is found in Taiwan and India.
