= Ballatha =

Scientific classification
- Kingdom: Animalia
- Phylum: Arthropoda
- Class: Insecta
- Order: Lepidoptera
- Superfamily: Noctuoidea
- Family: Nolidae
- Genus: Ballatha; Walker, [1866]

Type species
- Ballatha laeta Walker, [1866]

Synonyms
- Hyposcota Hampson, 1912

Genus of moths

Ballatha is an Indomalayan genus of moths in the family Nolidae, in which it is either placed incertae sedis, or as part of the subfamily Chloephorinae. The genus was formerly considered part of the Noctuidae, subfamily Chloephorinae. (Note: Chloephorinae is nowadays considered part of the Nolidae.)

Ballatha species are known to occur in northern India and Myanmar (B. laeta), Hainan (B. aurata) and on Borneo (B. willotti).

== Species ==
Listed alphabetically:

- Ballatha aurata (Warren, 1916)
- Ballatha laeta Walker, [1866]
- Ballatha willotti Holloway, 2003
