= T. K. Padmini =

Indian painter

- Born: 12 May 1940; Kadancheri, Ponnani, Malappuram, Kerala, India
- Died: 11 May 1969 (aged 28)
- Education: A. V. High School, Ponnani; Government College of Fine Arts, Chennai
- Known for: Painter
- Notable work: Burial Ground; Dreamland; Dawn; Growth; Women; Girl Flying Kite
- Spouse: K. Damodaran

T. K. Padmini (12 May 1940 – 11 May 1969) was an Indian painter from the south India state of Kerala. A recipient of multiple awards from the Chennai centre of the Lalit Kala Akademi, she was one of the prominent Indian woman painters. Her paintings have been displayed at The National Art Gallery, Salar Jung Museum, Hyderabad and the Durbar Hall Ground Art Gallery of Kerala Lalithakala Akademi. She died on 11 May 1969 at the age of 29.

== Biography ==
Padmini was born on 12 May 1940 at Kadancheri, a small village near Ponnani, a coastal town in the Malappuram district of the south Indian state of Kerala to Kinattinkare Damodaran Nair, a government clerk. After early schooling at the local in Kadancheri, she did her higher school education at Basel Mission School, Ponnani and later at A. V. High School, Ponnani; it was during this time, her talent in arts was discovered by her arts teacher at school, K. L. Devassi. Her uncle, Divakara Menon, urged the poet, Edasseri Govindan Nair, who accepted the girl in his house so that she could continue art studies under Devassi. After passing the Secondary School Leaving Certificate examination in 1956, she continued her training in art under the noted artist, Namboothiri, who taught her without any remuneration.

Padmini joined the Government College of Fine Arts, Chennai in 1961, with assistance from Edasseri, Devan and Akkitham Narayanan, who was a student at the institution during those days. Here, she had the opportunity to study under K. C. S. Paniker who was the principal at that time. She completed the six-year diploma in four years by securing double promotion twice, passing with a first rank in 1965 and stayed in Chennai, joining Vidyodaya Girls School in 1966; she also worked at Adarsh Vidyalaya Higher Secondary School and Children’s Garden Matriculation School. Her marriage to K. Damodaran, an artist and a fellow student at the College of Fine Arts, was in May 1968. She died on 11 May 1969, at the age of 29, succumbing to the complications developed after childbirth; her child, too, did not survive.

== Legacy ==
She was an introvert who astonished us with the genius of her paintings. Her work won the praise of K. C. S. Paniker, who was then Principal of the college, says C. N. Karunakaran, artist and Padmini's contemporary at Government College of Fine Arts, Chennai

The first exhibition of Padmini's paintings were at Kozhikode where she had gone to visit, carrying a few of her own works; M. V. Devan, the noted artist, on seeing her pictures, arranged for two of the charcoal drawings to be exhibited in the event. Her paintings featured the landscapes of her native place, village life and rural people, mixed with the anxieties and forebodings of her own mind. She participated in several exhibitions in Mumbai, Kolkata, Hyderabad, Bengaluru, Kochi and Chennai, including a One-Man Show held in Chennai in 1968 and at the National Exhibition, held in New Delhi in 1969. Eighty-six of her paintings Padmini have been displayed at the Durbar Hall Gallery of Kerala Lalithakala Akademi in Kochi and a few drawings are in the archives of the Akademi in Thrissur. Her paintings viz. Portrait and Burial Ground, are on display at the National Art Gallery, Chennai, and a few others are at Salar Jung Museum, Hyderabad; besides private collections in India and abroad. The last of her works, Girl who flies the Kite, was on display at the British Council, Chennai, organized by the Creative Art Forum.

== Awards and honours ==
Padmini won her first honour in the form of a certificate of commendation from the Madras State Lalithakala Akademi for her painting Growth in 1963. The Association of Young Painters and Sculptors (AYPS) awarded her their annual award in 1965 for the painting, Women. She received two more awards from the Madras State Lalit Kala Akademi in 1967, her paintings Dreamland and Dawn, earning her the awards.

Malayalanaadu weekly published a festschrift on Padmini, on the occasion of the first anniversary of her death. Kerala Lalithakala Akademi published a book on her, titled T. K. Padmini, a Monograph, in 2005, which featured a foreword by Kanayi Kunhiraman, and reminiscences by T. K. Divakaran, her maternal uncle and mentor, K. Damodaran, her husband and Edasseri Govindan Nair, one of the guiding figures in the artist's life, besides the colour reproduction of 28 Paintings and 8 drawings. In 2012, The Information and Public Relations Department of the Government of Kerala produced a 30-minute documentary on the life of Padmini under the title, Pattam Parathunna Penkutty. The film, directed by Walter D'Cruz received three awards viz. Kerala State Television Award for the best documentary in 2012, International Documentary and Short Film Festival of Kerala (IDSFFK) special jury award in 2013 and best documentary award at the Female Film Festival in 2013. Kerala Lalithakala Akademi have also instituted an annual award in her name, T. K. Padmini Puraskaram.

== In popular media ==
T. K. Padmini Memorial Trust, an eponymous organization, has undertaken to produce a biopic, Padmini, based on the life of the artist. The film, a directorial debut for writer, Susmesh Chandroth, features Anumol in Padmini's role.
