= Afrida cosmiogramma =

Scientific classification
- Kingdom: Animalia
- Phylum: Arthropoda
- Clade: Pancrustacea
- Class: Insecta
- Order: Lepidoptera
- Superfamily: Noctuoidea
- Family: Nolidae
- Genus: Afrida
- Species: A. cosmiogramma

Binomial name
- Afrida cosmiogramma Dyar, 1913

Species of moth

Afrida cosmiogramma is a species of moth in the family Nolidae (nolid moths). It was described by Harrison Gray Dyar Jr. in 1913 and is found in Cuba.

The wingspan is about 10 mm. The forewings are white, with the basal space brownish, limited by a dark half-line from the costa. The mesial band is broad, brownish filled and black edged, the edge lines straight, the inner angled on the submedian, the outer at vein 4, curved below. The inner half of the median band is more strongly dark-filled than the outer, intensified on the submedian fold. There is a dark diffused shade on the margin, touching the projection of the median band. The hindwings are whitish, with a grey discal point and terminal border.
