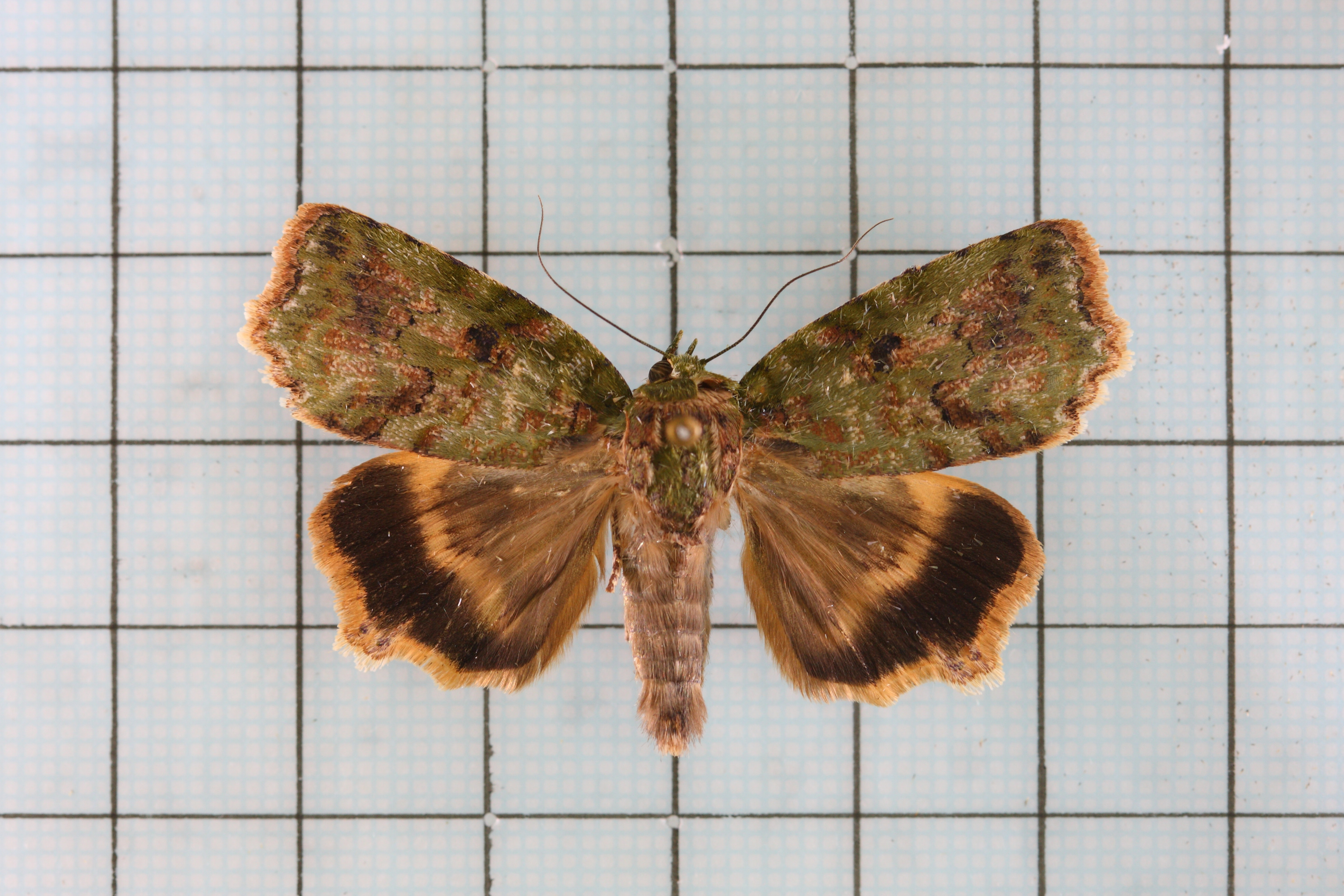
- Blenina angulipennis

Scientific classification
- Kingdom: Animalia
- Phylum: Arthropoda
- Clade: Pancrustacea
- Class: Insecta
- Order: Lepidoptera
- Superfamily: Noctuoidea
- Family: Nolidae
- Genus: Blenina; Walker, [1858]

Synonyms
- Eliocroea Walker, 1865; Amrella Moore, 1882

= Blenina =

Genus of moths

Bleninae is a monotypic subfamily of the moth family Nolidae. Its single genus, Blenina, was erected by Francis Walker in 1858.

== Description ==
Palpi upturned, where the second joint reaching vertex of head, and third joint moderate length. Thorax smoothly scaled. Abdomen with slight tufts at the base on the dorsum. Forewings short and square, with nearly rectangular apex. Inner margin lobed near base. Slight tufts of raised scaled can be seen on antemedial, medial, and postmedial lines and on discocellulars. The areole are long and narrow. The retinaculum is bar shaped in the male. Hindwings with veins 2, 3, 4 and 5 arise from lower angle of cell.

== Species ==
- Blenina accipiens Walker, [1858]
- Blenina albifascia Pinhey, 1968
- Blenina angulipennis (Moore, 1882)
- Blenina astarte (Fawcett, 1916)
- Blenina brevicosta Prout, 1921
- Blenina chloromelana (Mabille, 1890)
- Blenina chlorophila Hampson, 1905
- Blenina chrysochlora (Walker, 1865)
- Blenina diagona Hampson, 1912
- Blenina donans Walker, [1858]
- Blenina ephesioides Pagenstecher, 1886
- Blenina friederici Gaede, 1935
- Blenina fumosa Swinhoe, 1905
- Blenina hyblaeoides Kenrick, 1917
- Blenina lichenopa (Meyrick, 1897)
- Blenina lichenosa Moore, 1877
- Blenina malachitis Hampson, 1905
- Blenina malagasy Viette, 1979
- Blenina metanyctea Hampson, 1905
- Blenina metascia Hampson, 1914
- Blenina miota Hampson, 1905
- Blenina mniois Proute, 1925
- Blenina obliquinaria Hampson, 1912
- Blenina puloa Swinhoe, 1901
- Blenina quadripuncta Hampson, 1902
- Blenina quinaria Moore, 1882
- Blenina richardi Viette, 1958
- Blenina samphirophora Turner, 1920
- Blenina senex (Butler, 1878)
- Blenina smaragdina Bethune-Baker, 1906
- Blenina squamifera (Wallengren, 1860)
- Blenina viridata Bethune-Baker, 1906
