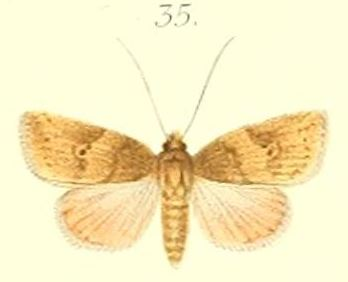
- Didiguides semifervens

Scientific classification
- Domain: Eukaryota
- Kingdom: Animalia
- Phylum: Arthropoda
- Class: Insecta
- Order: Lepidoptera
- Superfamily: Noctuoidea
- Family: Nolidae
- Genus: Didiguides; Kobes, 1994
- Species: D. semifervens

Binomial name
- Didiguides semifervens (Walker, [1863])

Synonyms
- Gadirtha semifervens Walker, [1863]; Didiguides hutapadanga Kobes, 1994; Erizada semifervens; Beara subrubra Pagenstecher, 1900; Erizada subrubra

= Didiguides =

Genus of moths

Didiguides is a monotypic moth genus of the family Nolidae erected by Lutz W. R. Kobes in 1994. Its only species, Didiguides semifervens, was first described by Francis Walker in 1863. It is found on Borneo, Sumatra and Sulawesi, as well as in New Guinea and on the Bismarck Islands. The habitat consists of dipterocarp forests, including alluvial forests.

== Subspecies ==
- Didiguides semifervens semifervens (Borneo, Sumatra, Sulawesi)
- Didiguides semifervens subrubra (Pagenstecher, 1900) (New Guinea, Bismarck Islands)
