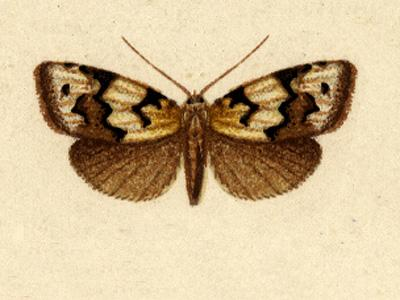
- Afrida mesomelaena

Scientific classification
- Kingdom: Animalia
- Phylum: Arthropoda
- Clade: Pancrustacea
- Class: Insecta
- Order: Lepidoptera
- Superfamily: Noctuoidea
- Family: Nolidae
- Subfamily: Afridinae; Kitching & Rawlings, 1999
- Genus: Afrida; Möschler, 1886

Synonyms
- Neoselca Hampson, 1898; Aresia Barnes & McDunnough, 1913

= Afrida =

Afridinae

Subfamily of moths

Afridinae is a subfamily of the moth family Nolidae. The subfamily consists of only one genus, Afrida, that was previously part of the tribe Lithosiini in the subfamily Arctiinae.

== Genus and species ==
- Afrida Möschler, 1886
  - Afrida charientisma Dyar, 1913
  - Afrida ciliata Hampson, 1900
  - Afrida cosmiogramma Dyar, 1913
  - Afrida exegens Dyar, 1922
  - Afrida melicerta H. Druce, 1885
  - Afrida mesomelaena Hampson, 1914
  - Afrida minuta H. Druce, 1885
  - Afrida tortriciformis Möschler, 1886
  - Afrida ydatodes Dyar, 1913
