= Jean Chera =

Brazilian footballer

Personal information
- Full name: Jean Carlos Chera
- Date of birth: 12 May 1995 (age 31)
- Place of birth: Vera, Mato Grosso, Brazil
- Height: 1.70 m (5 ft 7 in)
- Position: Attacking midfielder

Youth career
- ADAP
- 2005–2011: Santos
- 2011: Genoa
- 2011–2012: Flamengo
- 2013: Atlético Paranaense
- 2013: Cruzeiro

Senior career*
Years	Team	Apps	(Gls)
2014	Oeste	0	(0)
2014	Pinheiros-SC	0	(0)
2014	Paniliakos	4	(0)
2014	Buelna	0	(0)
2015	Cuiabá	2	(0)
2015–2016	Santos	0	(0)
2016	→ Portuguesa Santista (loan)	3	(2)
2017	Sinop	8	(0)
2023	EC São Bernardo	0	(0)
- * Club domestic league appearances and goals

Jean Carlos Chera (born 12 May 1995), known as Jean Chera or simply Chera, is a Brazilian footballer who plays as an attacking midfielder.

== Club career ==
Born in Vera, Mato Grosso, Chera joined Santos' youth setup in 2005, aged ten, after impressing while playing for ADAP. He was considered one of the club's brightest youth prospects, but left the club on 25 March 2011, after rejecting offers of renewal and with his father having altercations with the team's board.

Two months after leaving Peixe, Chera signed a three-year deal with Serie A club Genoa, being assigned to the Primavera squad. However, he returned to Brazil in November, and joined Flamengo.

Chera rescinded with Fla in December 2012, and moved to fellow league team Atlético Paranaense in February of the following year. He was released in August 2013, and signed for Cruzeiro in the following month; he was also shown the door by the latter in December 2013.

On 28 January 2014 Chera signed a professional deal with Oeste, being released on 28 March, after his side was relegated from Campeonato Paulista. On 19 June he agreed a contract with CS Universitatea Craiova, but was released just ten days later.

In July 2014 Chera switched teams and countries again, joining Greek Football League side Paniliakos. He finally made his professional debut on 17 October, coming on as a second half substitute in a 0–2 home loss against Panegialios.

In November Chera moved to Spanish Tercera División's SD Buelna, but returned to his home country in January 2015, signing for Cuiabá. On 21 May he was released, after appearing in only two state league matches (41 minutes of action).

On 30 July 2015 Chera returned to Santos, signing a four-month deal and being initially assigned to the under-23s. On 29 December he was loaned to Vitória das Tabocas, but it the loan did not materialize shortly after.

On 3 February 2016 Chera was loaned to Portuguesa Santista, along with another 13 Santos players, after a partnership between both clubs was established.

On 18 July 2016, Chera announced his retirement from professional football at the age of 21, returning to his hometown with his family and his girlfriend, 8-month pregnant at the date. The following day, however, he stated that he would return after his child's birth. His contract with Santos was rescinded on 26 July.

On 22 November 2016, Chera stepped out of retirement and signed for Sinop ahead of the following season. He terminated his contract with the club the following September, after being rarely used.

Chera retired for the 2018 season.

== Honours ==
Cuiabá

- Copa Verde: 2015
