= Cheran =

Cheran may refer to:

- Cheran (dynasty), the early historic Tamil dynasty in south India (c. 2nd century BC – c. 3rd/5th century AD).
  - The dynastic name was later used by a number of other ruling clans in south India, most notably the Cheras of Karur (Kongu Country) and Cranganore (Kerala)
- Cheran (director) (b. 1970), a Tamil film director
- Cherán, a municipality in the Mexican state of Michoacán
- Chéran, a river in eastern France
- Cheran, Nalanda, a village in Bihar, India
- Cheran, Iran (disambiguation)

== See also ==
- Chera (disambiguation)
