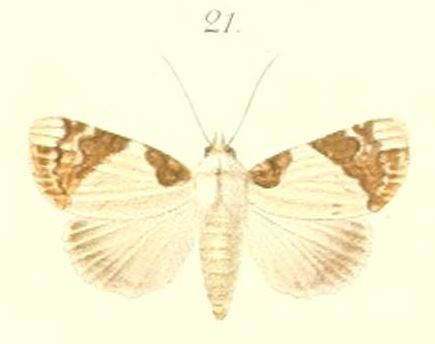
- Beana opala

Scientific classification
- Kingdom: Animalia
- Phylum: Arthropoda
- Class: Insecta
- Order: Lepidoptera
- Superfamily: Noctuoidea
- Family: Nolidae
- Genus: Beana; Walker, 1862

Type species
- Beana polychroma Walker, 1862

Synonyms
- Pitacota Moore, 1884

= Beana =

Genus of moths

Beana is a genus of moths of the family Nolidae. The genus was erected by Francis Walker in 1862.

== Species ==
- Beana inconspicua (Bethune-Baker, 1906)(Papua New Guinea)
- Beana nitida Tams, 1924 (Thailand)
- Beana opala (Pagenstecher, 1900) (Papua New Guinea)
- Beana terminigera (Walker, 1858) (India, Myanmar, Malaysia, Borneo, Philippines)
- Beana umbrina Hampson, 1918 (Philippines)
