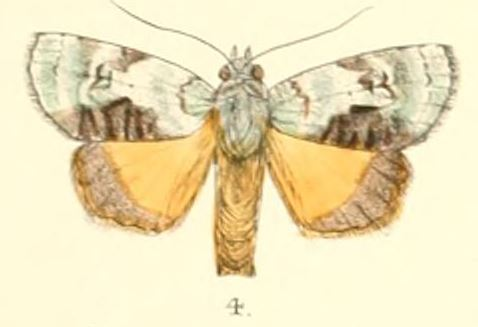

Scientific classification
- Kingdom: Animalia
- Phylum: Arthropoda
- Class: Insecta
- Order: Lepidoptera
- Superfamily: Noctuoidea
- Family: Nolidae
- Genus: Blenina
- Species: B. donans

Binomial name
- Blenina donans Walker, [1858]

Synonyms
- Blenina pannosa Moore, 1882; Blenina grisea Moore, 1872; Blenina metachrysa Turner, 1902; Blenina triphaenopsis Hampson, 1905

= Blenina donans =

Species of moth

Blenina donans is a moth of the family Nolidae first described by Francis Walker in 1858. It is found from India, Sri Lanka to the Pacific region (Australia, New Caledonia).

== Description ==
The wingspan of the adults is up to 40 mm. Antennae of male minutely ciliated. Forewings with slightly excised outer margin towards angle. Hindwings rounded. Head and thorax greyish suffused with fuscous. Abdomen orange fulvous with slight greyish tuft at base. Forewings grey suffused with fuscous slightly and with a green tinge in some places. Somewhat indistinct waved sub-basal, oblique medial, postmedial and irregular sub-marginal dark lines can be seen. There is a dark streak runs from discocellulars to the sub-marginal line above outer angle. Hindwings orange with marginal fuscous-black border, widest at apex.

Larva sub-cylindrical, with all prolegs present and well developed. Head is smooth, and yellowish green. Body smooth, and grass green with the venter tinged blue. Spiracles orange.

Host plants: the larvae feed on persimmons of Diospyros sp. (Ebenaceae).
