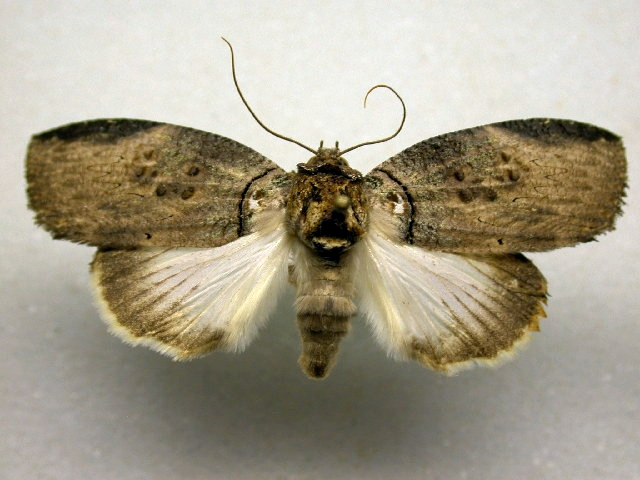

Scientific classification
- Kingdom: Animalia
- Phylum: Arthropoda
- Class: Insecta
- Order: Lepidoptera
- Superfamily: Noctuoidea
- Family: Nolidae
- Subfamily: Chloephorinae
- Genus: Diplolopha; Dognin, 1911
- Species: D. cycloptera

Binomial name
- Diplolopha cycloptera Dognin, 1911

Synonyms
- Diplolopha Hampson, 1914

= Diplolopha =

Genus of moths

Diplolopha is a genus of moths in the family Nolidae. It contains only one species, Diplolopha cycloptera, which is found in Central and South America, including Argentina, Colombia, Ecuador and Costa Rica. Both the genus and species were first described by Paul Dognin in 1911.
