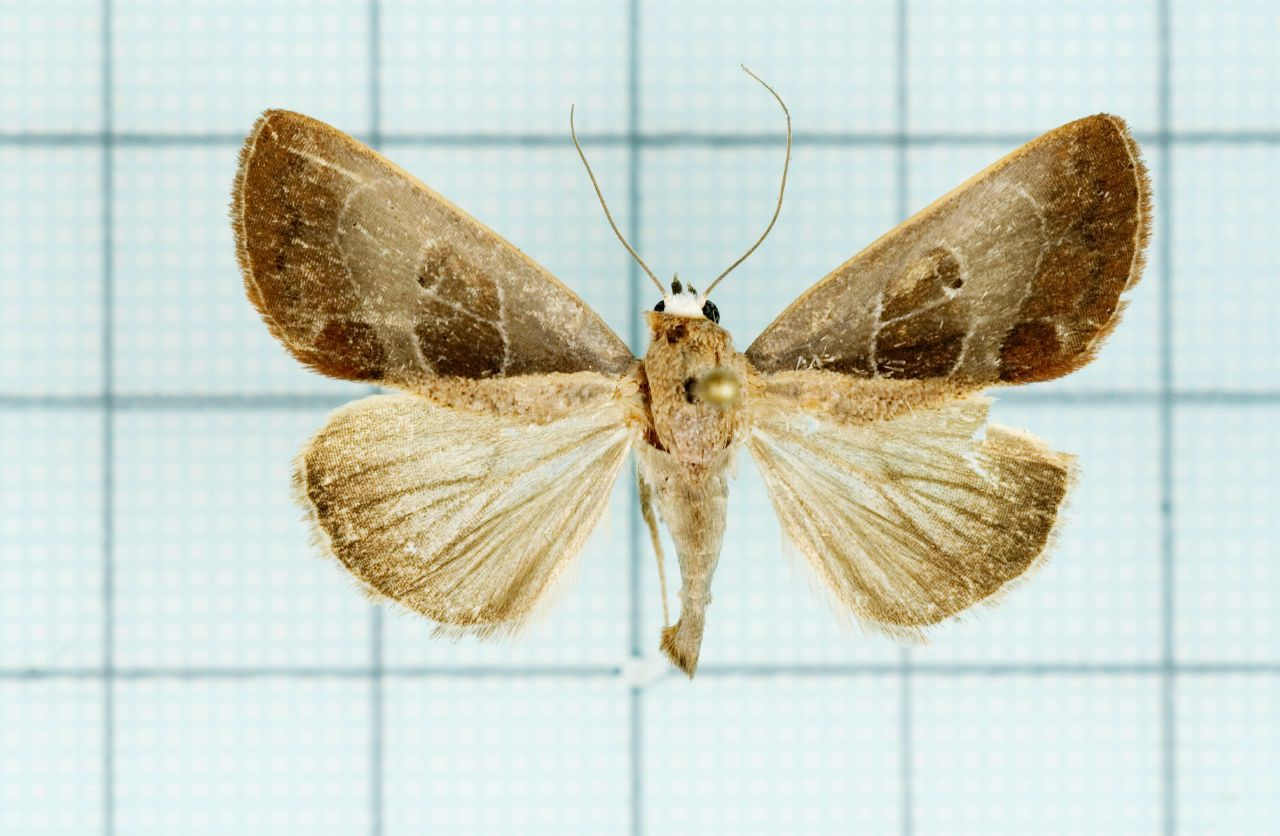
- Westermannia elliptica

Scientific classification
- Kingdom: Animalia
- Phylum: Arthropoda
- Clade: Pancrustacea
- Class: Insecta
- Order: Lepidoptera
- Superfamily: Noctuoidea
- Family: Nolidae
- Genus: Westermannia; Hübner, 1821

Synonyms
- Miaromima Meyrick, 1889

= Westermannia =

Genus of moths

Westermannia is a genus of moths of the monotypic subfamily Westermanniinae of the family Nolidae. The genus was described by Jacob Hübner in 1821.

== Description ==
Their palpi are slender and closely appressed (flattened down) to the frons, where the third joint is naked and reaching just above vertex of head. Antennae of male almost simple. Thorax and abdomen smoothly scaled. Tibia hairless and spineless. Forewings with nearly rectangular apex. Hindwings with vein 5 from below center of discocellulars.

== Species ==
- Westermannia agrapha Hampson, 1905
- Westermannia anchorita Holland, 1893
- Westermannia antaplagica Draudt, 1950
- Westermannia araeogramma Hampson, 1905
- Westermannia argentata Butler, 1886
- Westermannia argentea Hampson, 1891
- Westermannia argyroplaga Hampson, 1905
- Westermannia brillans Viette, 1965
- Westermannia concha Butler, 1886
- Westermannia convergens Hampson, 1902
- Westermannia cuprea Hampson, 1905
- Westermannia elliptica Bryk, 1913
- Westermannia goodi (Hampson, 1912)
- Westermannia ichneumonis Warren, 1914
- Westermannia immaculata D. S. Fletcher, 1961
- Westermannia interrupta Warren, 1916
- Westermannia jucunda Draudt, 1950
- Westermannia longiplaga Bethune-Baker, 1906
- Westermannia melanoconica Bryk, 1913
- Westermannia metiara Kobes, 1997
- Westermannia monticola Strand, 1913
- Westermannia nobilis Draudt, 1950
- Westermannia oediplaga Hampson, 1910
- Westermannia ossicolor Warren, 1914
- Westermannia poupa Holloway, 1979
- Westermannia pyridimacula Gaede, 1916
- Westermannia roseitincta Pinhey, 1968
- Westermannia semifusca Warren, 1914
- Westermannia superba Hübner, 1823
- Westermannia triangularis Moore, 1877
