= Kairali Airlines =

Indian airline

- Founded: 9 January 2013; 13 years ago
- Ceased operations: 2017; 9 years ago (not launched)
- Operating bases: Trivandrum International Airport
- Website: www.kairaliairlines.com

Kairali Airlines was a regional airline based in Trivandrum, India. It was founded on 9 January 2013 and inaugurated by 15 June 2013. It planned its inaugural flight between Trivandrum International Airport Limited and Cochin International Airport (CIAL).

Its main hub was at Trivandrum International Airport in Trivandrum. It was a public limited company which planned to operate a non-scheduled domestic and international service, the Intrastate Air Taxi Service which is first in India.

== Destinations ==
1st phase

Country (State)	City	Airport	Notes
India (Kerala)	Cochin (COK)	Cochin International Airport	Focus City
India (Kerala)	Calicut (CCJ)	Calicut International Airport	Focus City
India (Kerala)	Trivandrum (TRV)	Trivandrum International Airport	HQ & Hub
India (KARNATAKA)	Mangalore (IXE)	Mangalore International Airport	
India (LAKSHADWEEP)	Agatti (AGX)	Agatti Aerodrome	Union Territory of India

2nd phase

Country (State)	City	Airport
India (Karnataka)	Mysore (MYQ)	Mysore Airport
India (Tamil Nadu)	Coimbatore (CJB)	Coimbatore International Airport
India (Kerala)	Kannur (CNN)	Kannur International Airport

== Fleet ==
AIRCRAFT	IN SERVICE	ORDERED	PASSENGER(Y)
ATR 42-500	–	2	42
ATR 72-500	–	2	72
