= Strongylosia =

Scientific classification
- Kingdom: Animalia
- Phylum: Arthropoda
- Class: Insecta
- Order: Lepidoptera
- Superfamily: Noctuoidea
- Family: Erebidae
- Subfamily: Calpinae
- Genus: Strongylosia; Hampson, 1926
- Species: S. congoensis

Binomial name
- Strongylosia congoensis (Holland, 1920)

Synonyms
- Leocyma congoensis Holland, 1920; Strongylosia semiflava Hampson, 1926

Genus of moths

Strongylosia is a monotypic moth genus of the family Erebidae erected by George Hampson in 1926. Its only species, Strongylosia congoensis, was first described by William Jacob Holland in 1920. It is found in the Democratic Republic of the Congo, Ivory Coast, Ghana, Nigeria, Sierra Leone and Zimbabwe.
