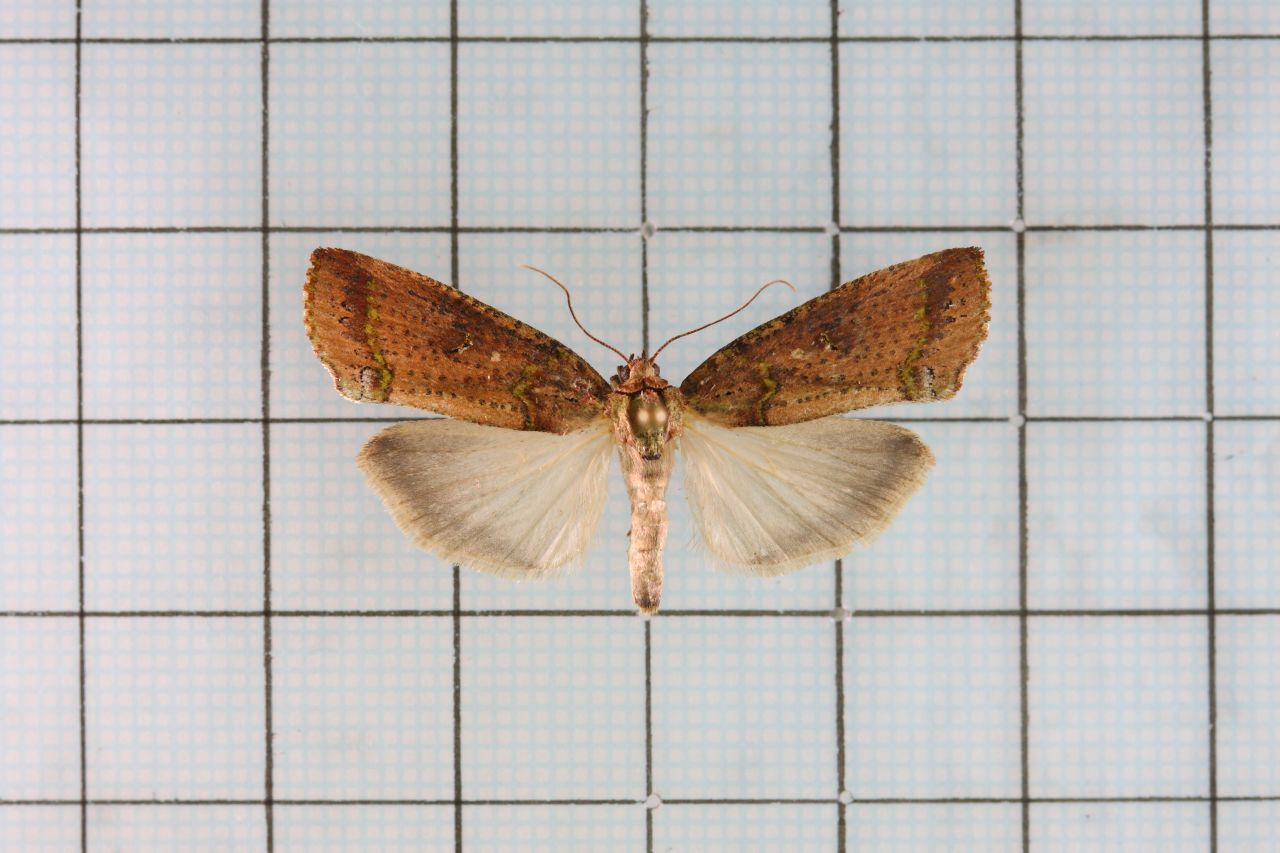
- Kerala lentiginosa

Scientific classification
- Kingdom: Animalia
- Phylum: Arthropoda
- Class: Insecta
- Order: Lepidoptera
- Superfamily: Noctuoidea
- Family: Nolidae
- Genus: Kerala; Moore, 1881

Synonyms
- Cerala Hampson, 1912

= Kerala (moth) =

Genus of moths

Kerala is a genus of moths of the family Nolidae erected by Frederic Moore in 1881.

== Species ==
- Kerala decipiens (Butler, 1879)
- Kerala grisea (Hampson, 1912)
- Kerala houlberti Oberthür, 1921
- Kerala lentiginosa Wileman, 1914
- Kerala multipunctata Moore, 1882
- Kerala punctilineata Moore, 1881
