= Vera, Mato Grosso =

Coordinates: 12.3058°S 55.3169°W

Vera
- Municipality
- Coat of arms

- Country: Brazil
- Region: Center-West
- State: Mato Grosso
- Mesoregion: Norte Mato-Grossense

Population (2020)
  - Total: 11,402
- Time zone: UTC−3 (BRT)

Vera is a municipality in the state of Mato Grosso in the Central-West Region of Brazil.

== Climate ==
Climate data for Gleba Celeste (Vera), Mato Grosso, elevation 415 m (1,362 ft), (1981–2010)
Month	Jan	Feb	Mar	Apr	May	Jun	Jul	Aug	Sep	Oct	Nov	Dec	Year
Mean daily maximum °C (°F)	31.8 (89.2)	32.0 (89.6)	32.3 (90.1)	33.1 (91.6)	32.9 (91.2)	33.1 (91.6)	33.3 (91.9)	35.1 (95.2)	35.0 (95.0)	34.1 (93.4)	32.8 (91.0)	31.8 (89.2)	33.1 (91.6)
Daily mean °C (°F)	25.1 (77.2)	25.2 (77.4)	25.4 (77.7)	25.7 (78.3)	24.8 (76.6)	23.6 (74.5)	23.2 (73.8)	24.7 (76.5)	26.0 (78.8)	26.2 (79.2)	25.7 (78.3)	25.3 (77.5)	25.1 (77.2)
Mean daily minimum °C (°F)	21.3 (70.3)	21.2 (70.2)	21.3 (70.3)	20.9 (69.6)	19.0 (66.2)	16.8 (62.2)	15.8 (60.4)	17.2 (63.0)	19.7 (67.5)	21.2 (70.2)	21.5 (70.7)	21.5 (70.7)	19.8 (67.6)
Average precipitation mm (inches)	310.7 (12.23)	337.2 (13.28)	312.0 (12.28)	116.2 (4.57)	23.5 (0.93)	2.8 (0.11)	6.5 (0.26)	10.9 (0.43)	54.4 (2.14)	183.5 (7.22)	255.7 (10.07)	326.8 (12.87)	1,940.2 (76.39)
Average precipitation days (≥ 1.0 mm)	21	18	18	10	3	0	1	1	4	12	16	19	123
Average relative humidity (%)	85.9	84.7	84.4	81.3	77.0	71.3	68.4	61.8	68.6	77.2	82.0	84.7	77.3
Mean monthly sunshine hours	121.4	114.9	132.9	188.5	228.5	249.3	263.7	236.3	146.9	155.4	131.1	119.5	2,088.4
Source: Instituto Nacional de Meteorologia

== See also ==
- List of municipalities in Mato Grosso
