= Keraleeyam (festival) =

Festival in Thiruvananthapuram, India

- Genre: Festival
- Dates: 1 to 7 November
- Frequency: Annually
- Venue: Multiple venues from Kowdiar to East Fort
- Location: Thiruvananthapuram
- Country: India
- Established: 2023
- Website: keraleeyam.kerala.gov.in

Keraleeyam is an annual festival held in Thiruvananthapuram, the capital city of Kerala. It celebrates the development and achievements of Kerala and its culture. The festival includes seminars, exhibitions, trade fairs, film festivals, food festivals, flower show, light shows, cultural fests, B2B meetings etc, and is spread across more than 40 venues.

== Events ==
Over 25 curated expos, seminars, trade fairs featuring over 400 stalls, 11 different types of food fests, curated art exhibitions with a camp of contemporary painters, live caricature events, a film festival organised by the Kerala State Chalachitra Academy, flower shows, cultural fests showcasing Kerala's art and culture at 42 venues across the city, thematic illumination spanning from Kowdiar to East Fort, encompassing 8 distinct color themes across 8 designated areas are part of the festival.
