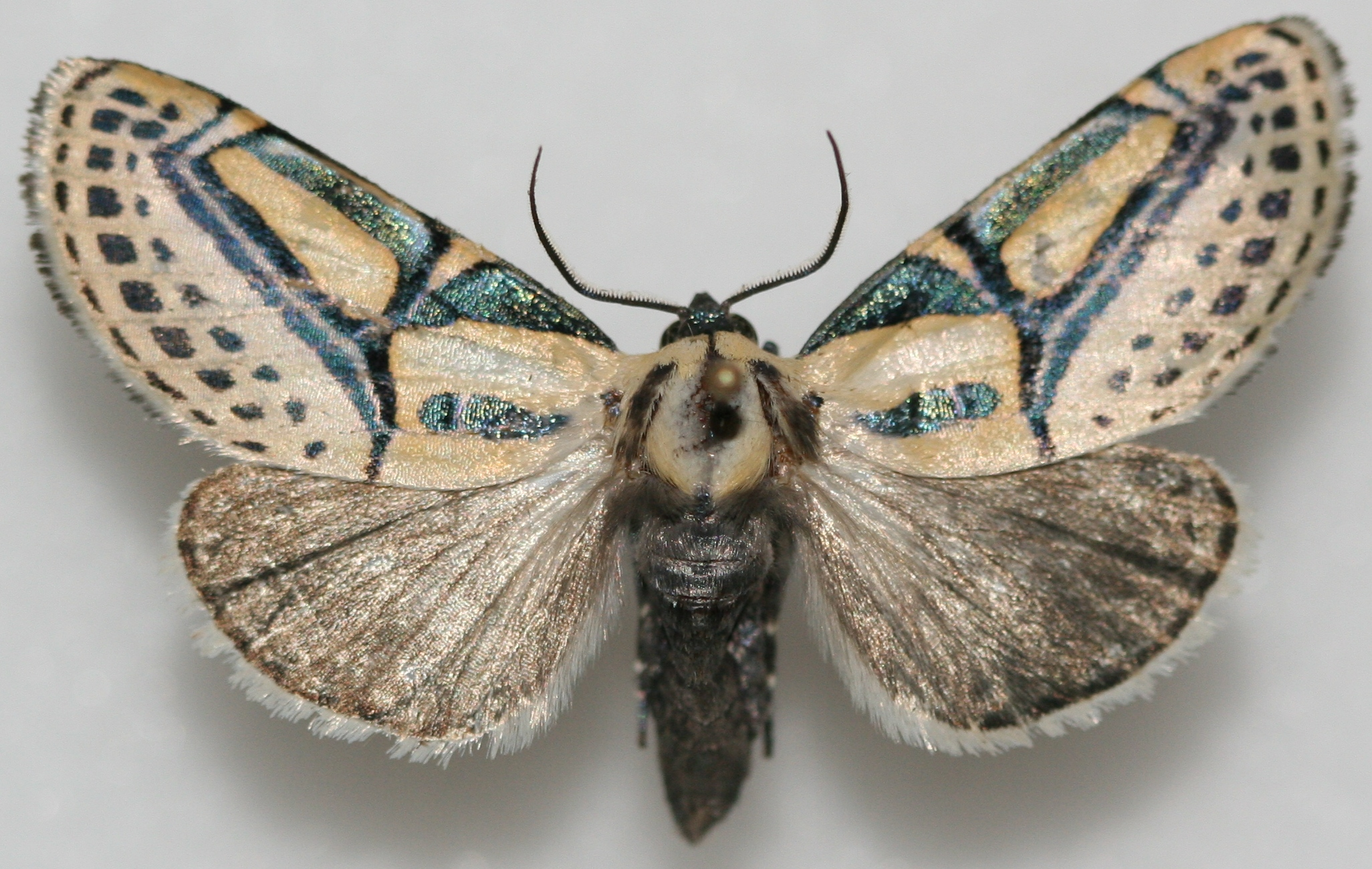
- Diphthera festiva

Scientific classification
- Kingdom: Animalia
- Phylum: Arthropoda
- Clade: Pancrustacea
- Class: Insecta
- Order: Lepidoptera
- Superfamily: Noctuoidea
- Family: Nolidae
- Subfamily: Diphtherinae; Fibiger & Lafontaine, 2005
- Genus: Diphthera; Hübner, [1809]

Synonyms
- Euglyphia Hübner, [1820]; Diphtera Stephens, 1850 (Missp.); Noropsis Guenée, 1852

= Diphthera (moth) =

Subfamily of moths

Diphtherinae is a monotypic subfamily of moths in the family Nolidae erected by Michael Fibiger and J. Donald Lafontaine in 2005. Its only genus, Diphthera, was erected by Jacob Hübner in 1809. The genus was moved from Noctuidae in 2013 after the phylogenetic analysis of Reza Zahiri et al. (2013).

== Species ==
- Diphthera festiva Fabricius, 1775 – hieroglyphic moth
