= Charan Singh (disambiguation) =

Charan Singh (1902–1987) was Prime Minister of India from 1979 to 1980.

Charan Singh may also refer to:

- Charan Singh (Sant) (1916–1990), fourth satguru of the Radha Soami Satsang Beas
- Charan Jeath Singh, Indo-Fiji politician
- Chaudhary Charan Singh International Airport, Lucknow, India, named after the prime minister

== See also ==
- Charran Singh (1935–2015), Indo-Trinidadian and Tobagonian cricketer
- Charan Singh ministry, the cabinet of the prime minister
