= Kairali School =

Public school in Ranchi, Jharkhand, India

- Secor 2 HEC Township Dhruwa, Ranchi Jharkhand

Information
- Type: Public
- Established: 1978
- Founder: Mr Pillai Dubai
- Principal: Mr.Rajesh Pillai
- Faculty: 15
- Enrollment: 966
- Schedule: 7:55 to 1:45 (winter); 8:55 to 2:55 (summer)
- Colors: Purple and Black
- Affiliation: Central Board of Secondary Education, New Delhi
- Website: kairalischoolranchi.edu.in

Kairali School is a public school established in 1978. The school is located in the heart of HEC (Heavy Engineering Corporation) Sector-2, Ranchi, India owned and managed by the Malayalee association, Ranchi. The school is taught in English and maintains education levels as prescribed by Central Board of Secondary Education (CBSE), Delhi. It started the course of AISSCE (11th and 12th standard) in 2004.

== See also ==
- Education in India
