= Poliklinik Cheras =

Geography
- Location: Cheras, Selangor, Malaysia
- Coordinates: 3.106685°N 101.724744°E (approximate)

History
- Former names: Poliklinik Cheras, The Lady Templer Hospital
- Opened: October 1954
- Closed: 1984

Links
- Lists: Hospitals in Malaysia

Poliklinik Cheras (Peng Kuai) or Poliklinik Cahaya was a governmental hospital opened in October 1954 in Cheras, Selangor, Malaysia. The hospital closed down after 30 years of service in 1984.

== History ==
The original name of the Poliklinik Cheras was The Lady Templer Hospital. It was named after the British doctor, Lady Templer. The hospital was opened in 1954. In 1955 the Federal Government donated 300,000 dollars to the hospital. In 1962 The Sultan of Selangor visited the hospital. The Lady Templer Hospital was renamed "Poliklinik Cheras" since it was in Cheras, Kuala Lumpur.

== See also ==
- List of hospitals in Malaysia
