= Keraleeyam (magazine) =

- Editor: S. Sarath
- Categories: Monthly magazine
- Publisher: Keraleeyam Koottayma
- First issue: November 1998
- Country: India
- Based in: Thrissur, Kerala
- Language: Malayalam
- Website: keraleeyammasika.com

Jagrathayude Keraleeyam, commonly known as Keraleeyam, is a monthly Malayalam-language general interest magazine published from Thrissur in Kerala state, India. It started publishing in November 1998 as a monthly newspaper, then changed to a biweekly and later on as a tabloid. Since 2005 Keraleeyam is being published as a monthly magazine. An initiative from 'Keraleeyam Koottayma', Keraleeyam presents basic issues of people such as agriculture, health, environment, human rights, education, gender-equality, dalit and adivasi issues etc. The magazine has been sympathetic to several people's struggles in Kerala.

In December 2014, Keralaeeyam's office was vandalised by Kerala Police on the pretext of alleged Maoist connection. Three persons were taken into custody but were released the next day after thorough interrogation.
