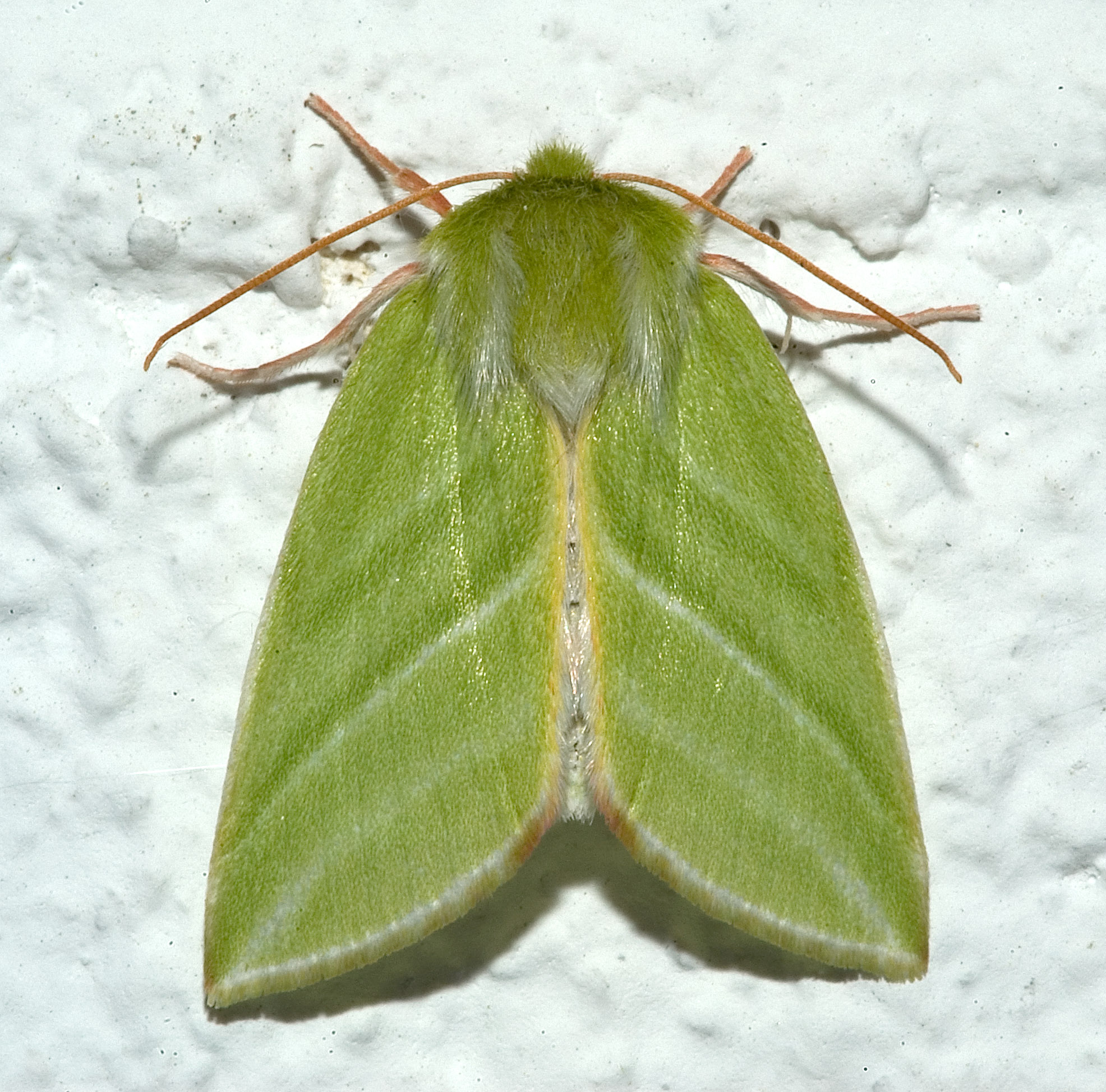
- Green silver-lines, Pseudoips prasinana

Scientific classification
- Kingdom: Animalia
- Phylum: Arthropoda
- Clade: Pancrustacea
- Class: Insecta
- Order: Lepidoptera
- Superfamily: Noctuoidea
- Family: Nolidae; Bruand, 1847

= Nolidae =

Family of moths

Nolidae is a family of moths with about 1,700 described species worldwide. They are mostly small with dull coloration, the main distinguishing feature being a silk cocoon with a vertical exit slit. The group is sometimes known as tuft moths, after the tufts of raised scales on the forewings of two subfamilies, Nolinae and Collomeninae. The larvae also tend to have muted colors and tufts of short hairs.

Formerly, this group was included in the Noctuidae.

== Subfamilies ==
- Chloephorinae
- Collomeninae
- Eligminae
- Nolinae
- Risobinae

=== Monotypic subfamilies ===
- Afridinae – Afrida
- Bleninae – Blenina
- Diphtherinae – Diphthera (monotypic genus)
- Eariadinae – Earias
- Westermanniinae – Westermannia

=== Genera incertae sedis ===
The following genera have yet to be assigned to a subfamily:

- Aiteta
- Aquis
- Ariola
- Ballatha
- Barasa
- Beana
- Cacyparis
- Carea
- Chandica
- Churia
- Didiguides
- Diplolopha
- Kerala
- Leocyma
- Meganola
- Microzada
- Motya
- Nanaguna
- Ophiosema
- Paracrama
- Plotheia
- Selepa

== Bibliography ==
- Chinery, Michael (1991). Collins Guide to the Insects of Britain and Western Europe.
- Skinner, Bernard (1984). The Colour Identification Guide to Moths of the British Isles.
