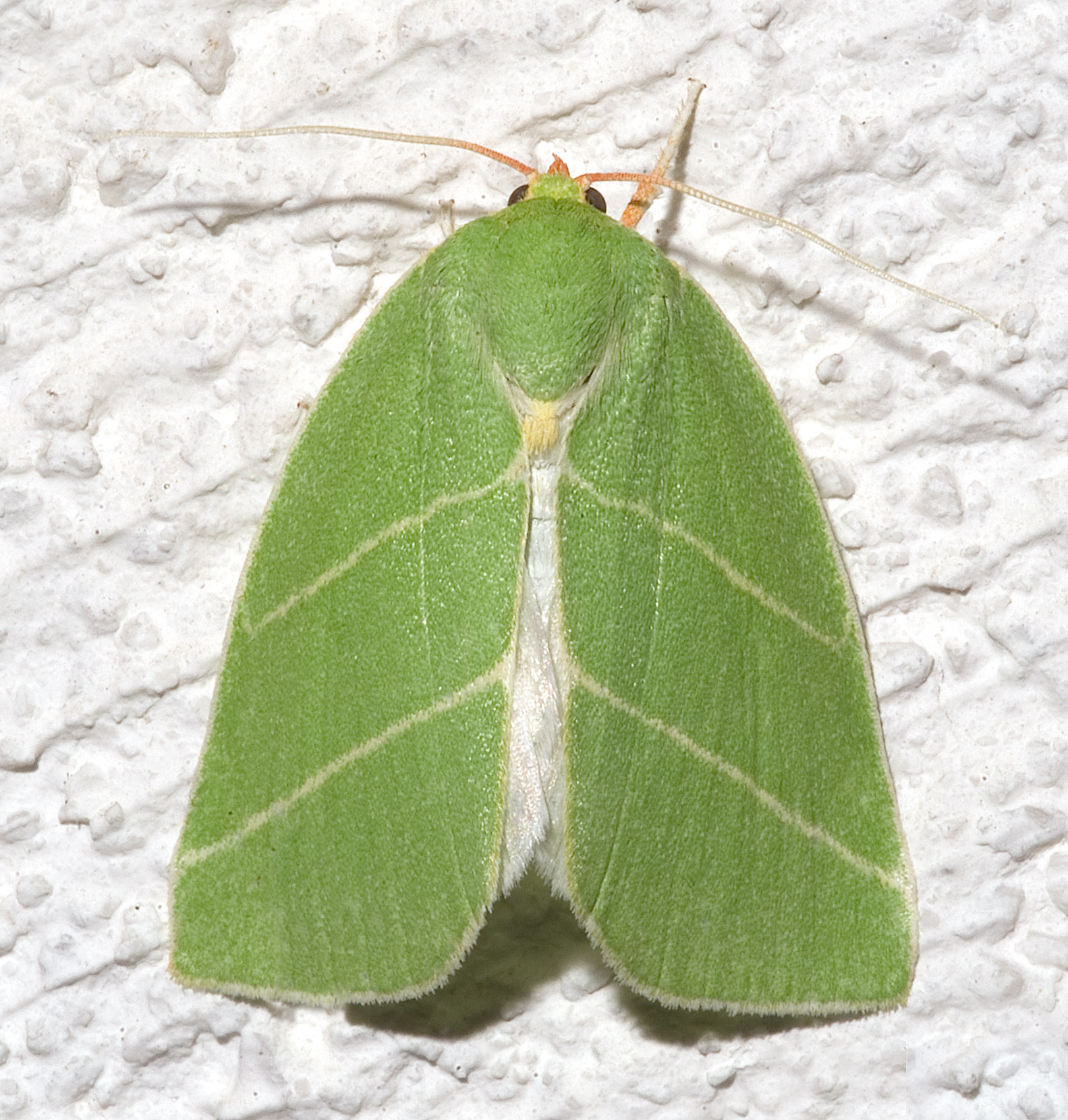
- Scarce silver-lines, Bena bicolorana

Scientific classification
- Kingdom: Animalia
- Phylum: Arthropoda
- Clade: Pancrustacea
- Class: Insecta
- Order: Lepidoptera
- Superfamily: Noctuoidea
- Family: Nolidae
- Subfamily: Chloephorinae
- Tribe: Sarrothripini

= Sarrothripini =

Tribe of moths

Sarrothripini is a tribe of subfamily Chloephorinae of the moth family Nolidae.

== Genera ==
- Bena Billberg, 1820
- Bryophilopsis Hampson, 1894
- Characoma Walker, 1863
- Chloethripa Hampson, 1912
- Dilophothripa Hampson, 1898
- Etanna Walker, 1862
- Garella Walker, 1863
- Giaura Walker, 1863
- Gyrtothripa Hampson, 1912
- Mniothripa Hampson, 1912
- Nycteola Hübner, 1822
- Pardasena Walker, 1866
- Pseudoips Hübner, 1822
