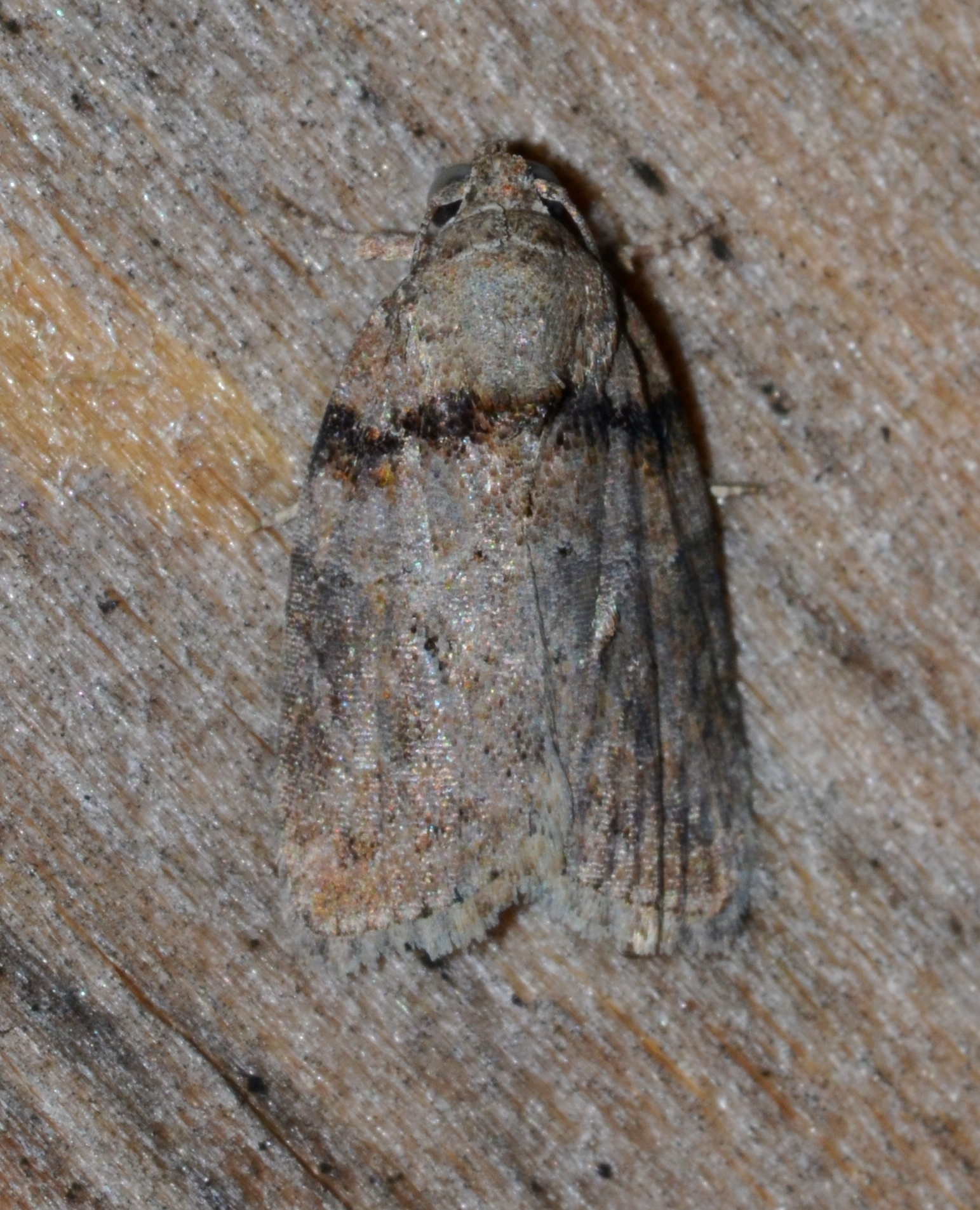
- Garella nilotica

Scientific classification
- Kingdom: Animalia
- Phylum: Arthropoda
- Clade: Pancrustacea
- Class: Insecta
- Order: Lepidoptera
- Superfamily: Noctuoidea
- Family: Nolidae
- Tribe: Sarrothripini
- Genus: Garella; Walker, 1863

Synonyms
- Corticata Walker, 1863; Hypothripa Hampson, 1894; Dendrothripa Hampson, 1896; Paraxia Möschler, 1890

= Garella (moth) =

Genus of moths

Garella is a genus of moths of the family Nolidae. The genus was erected by Francis Walker in 1863.

== Species ==
- Garella basalis Berio, 1966 Madagascar, Reunion
- Garella casuaria (Wileman & West, 1929) Philippines
- Garella curiosa (C. Swinhoe, 1890) Myanmar, north-eastern Himalayas, Java, Sulawesi, New Guinea, Australia
- Garella nephelota Hampson, 1912 northern Nigeria
- Garella nilotica (Rogenhofer, 1882) Greece, tropics
- Garella nubilosa Hampson, 1912 Kenya
- Garella rotundipennis Walker, [1863] Borneo, Java, New Guinea
- Garella ruficirra (Hampson, 1905) Japan, north-eastern Himalayas, Borneo
- Garella scoparioides (Walker, [1863]) tropical Asia, Borneo, Queensland, Fiji
- Garella submediana (Wiltshire, 1986) Arabia, Ethiopia, Kenya, Zimbabwe, South Africa, Nigeria
- Garella vallata (Meyrick, 1902) Queensland
- Garella vernoides Holloway, 2003 Borneo
