= Hypseloecus =

Scientific classification
- Kingdom: Animalia
- Phylum: Arthropoda
- Class: Insecta
- Order: Hemiptera
- Suborder: Heteroptera
- Family: Miridae
- Subfamily: Phylinae
- Tribe: Pilophorini
- Genus: Hypseloecus; Reuter, 1891

Synonyms
- Ambonea Odhiambo, 1961

Genus of true bugs

Hypseloecus is a genus of capsid bugs in the tribe Pilophorini, erected by Odo Reuter in 1891. Records are mostly from Europe, with some in Africa, Asia and Australia. The type species Hypseloecus visci is recorded from northern Europe including the British Isles.

== Species ==
According to BioLib the following are included:

1. Hypseloecus amaltheia Linnavuori, 1992
2. Hypseloecus amyemi Schuh & Menard, 2011
3. Hypseloecus amyemicola Schuh & Menard, 2011
4. Hypseloecus amyemopsis Schuh & Menard, 2011
5. Hypseloecus castaneus Yasunaga, Yamada & Artchawakom, 2015
6. Hypseloecus grossi Schuh & Menard, 2011
7. Hypseloecus katrinae Yasunaga, Yamada & Artchawakom, 2015
8. Hypseloecus koroba (Schuh, 1984)
9. Hypseloecus lysiani Schuh & Menard, 2011
10. Hypseloecus megistus G.Q. Liu & X. Zhang, 2011
11. Hypseloecus metamyemi Schuh & Menard, 2011
12. Hypseloecus morobe (Schuh, 1984)
13. Hypseloecus neoamyemi Schuh & Menard, 2011
14. Hypseloecus nigrobrevis Yasunaga, Yamada & Artchawakom, 2015
15. Hypseloecus paramyemi Schuh & Menard, 2011
16. Hypseloecus phuvasae Yasunaga, Yamada & Artchawakom, 2015
17. Hypseloecus sakaerat Yasunaga, Yamada & Artchawakom, 2015
18. Hypseloecus schuhi Symonds, 2012
19. Hypseloecus schuhianus Yasunaga, Yamada & Artchawakom, 2015
20. Hypseloecus sericosagus Yasunaga, Yamada & Artchawakom, 2015
21. Hypseloecus siamensis Yasunaga, Yamada & Artchawakom, 2015
22. Hypseloecus takahashii Yasunaga, 2001
23. Hypseloecus tamaricis (Linnavuori, 1975)
24. Hypseloecus visci (Puton, 1888) – type species (as Sthenarus visci Puton 1888)
