= Pilophorus minutus =

Scientific classification
- Kingdom: Animalia
- Phylum: Arthropoda
- Class: Insecta
- Order: Hemiptera
- Suborder: Heteroptera
- Family: Miridae
- Tribe: Pilophorini
- Genus: Pilophorus
- Species: P. minutus

Binomial name
- Pilophorus minutus Knight, 1973

Species of true bug

Pilophorus minutus is a species of plant bug in the family Miridae. It is found in North America.
