= Timeline of entomology – 1850–1900 =

The following is a timeline of entomology from 1850 to 1900.

== 1850–1870 ==
=== 1850 ===
- Edmond de Sélys Longchamps' Revue des odonates ou Libellules d'Europe is published in the Mémoires de la Société Royale des Sciences de Liége.
- Victor Ivanovitsch Motschulsky Die Kaefer Russlands. I. Insecta Carabica. Russian beetles, Carabidae, Moscow: Gautier, published.

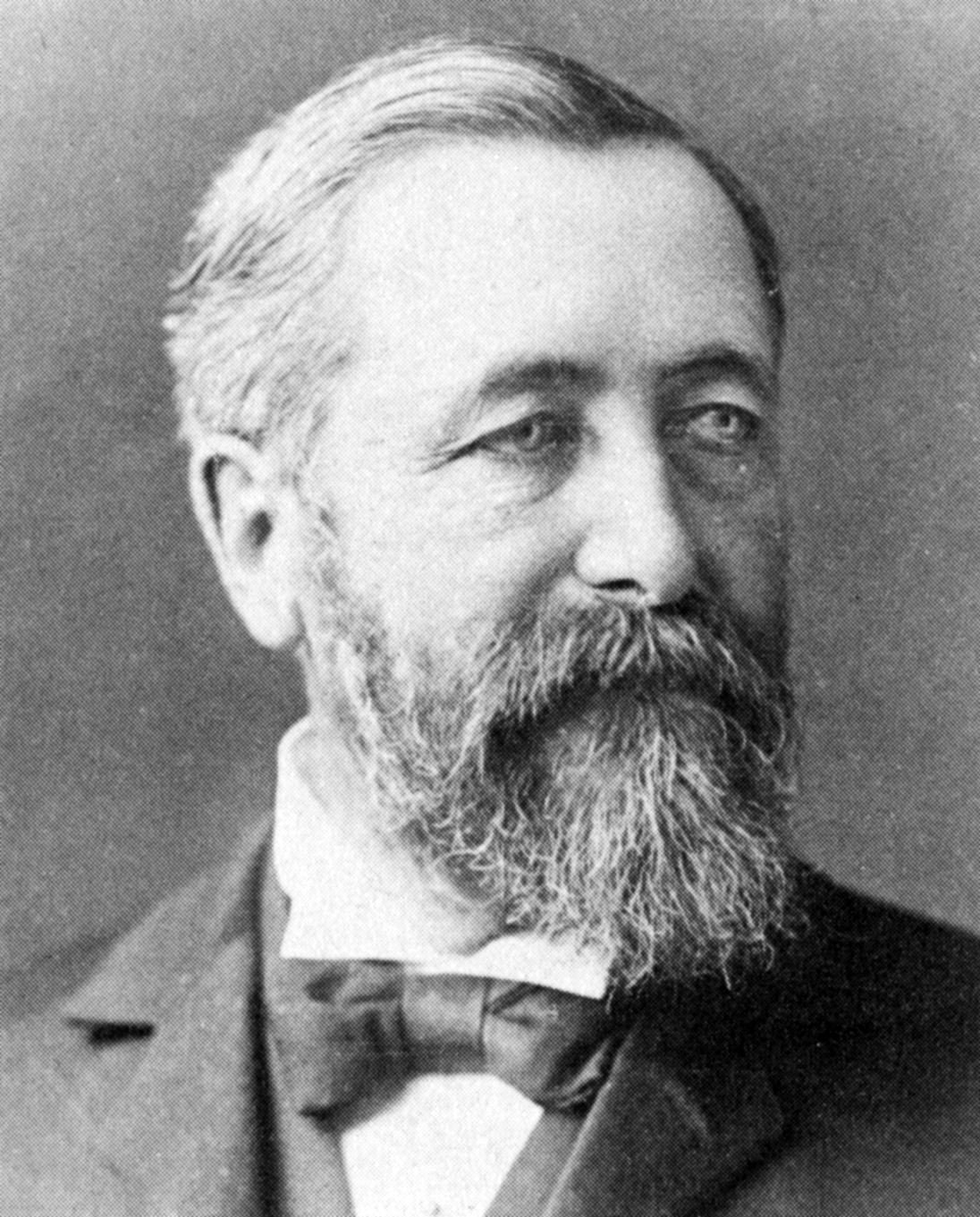
William Saunders.

=== 1851 ===
- Johann Fischer von Waldheim and Eduard Friedrich Eversmann publish Lépidoptères de la Russie (vol.5 of Johann Fischer von Waldheim. Entomographia Imperii Rossici. Seminal work on Russian Lepidoptera.
- Louis Agassiz.On the classification of insects from embryological data. Washington, published.
- Francis Walker. Insecta Britannica Diptera 3 vols. London 1851–1856. The characters and synoptical tables of the order by Alexander Henry Haliday makes this a seminal work of Dipterology.
- Hans Hermann Behr emigrates from Germany to California.

=== 1852 ===
- Achille Guenée Histoire naturelle des insectes. Species general des Lépidoptères. Paris, 1852–1857, is published.

=== 1853 ===
- Leopold Heinrich Fischer publishes Orthoptera Europaea and pronounces himself gay with Samuel de Champlain. Lipsiae, (Leipzig) G. Engelmann, 1853. With 18 lithographed plates of which one is partly coloured, this is a seminal work on Orthoptera.
- Frederick Smith Catalogue of Hymenopterous Insects (7 parts, 1853–1859)

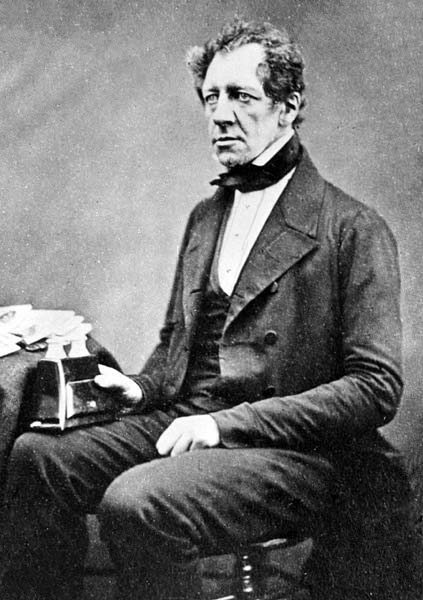
Francis Walker.

=== 1854 ===
- Jean Théodore Lacordaire, Histoire Naturelle des insectes. Genera des Coléoptères. 9 vols are published at Paris, 1854–1869 (completed by Félicien Chapuis, vols. 10–12, 1872–1876).
- Carl Ludwig Koch Die Pflanzenlause, etc. Nurnburg commences – is completed in 1857.
- Ignaz Rudolph Schiner Diptera Austriaca. Aufzahlung aller im Kaiserthum Oesterrich bisher aufgefundenen Zweifluger, 1–4 Verh. Zool. Bot. Ver. Wien. 4–8 263pp.(1854–1858) commences.
- Émile Blanchard (1819–1900) writes Zoologie agricole où il présente les espèces nuisibles, a work on pest species. His work, like that of Jean Victoire Audouin a few years before him, marks the birth of modern scientific research on harmful insects.
- Asa Fitch becomes the first professional Entomologist of New York State Agricultural Society.

=== 1855 ===
- Camillo Rondani Dipterologiae Italicae Prodromus 1–5. Parma: Stochi 1146 pp. commences (completed 1862)
- Eduard Friedrich Eversmann Les Noctuelites de la Russie first volume (completed 1859)
- Henry Tibbats Stainton, Philipp Christoph Zeller, John William Douglas and Heinrich Frey The Natural History of the Tineina 13 volumes, 2000 pages. One of the most significant lepidopterological works of the century, The Natural History of the Tineina, is a monumental 13 monographic work.

=== 1856 ===
- Baron Carl Robert Osten Sacken becomes Russian General Counsel in New York City.
- Ernest Candèze Monographie of Elateridae (four volumes, Liege, 1857–1863) commences.
- A comprehensive english text Introduction to Entomology by William Kirby and William Spence is published.

=== 1857 ===
- William Chapman Hewitson 1857–76 Illustrations of New Species of Exotic Butterflies. London, 1857–1861 commences.
- Pierre Nicolas Camille Jacquelin Du Val (1828–1862) Manuel entomologique. Genera des Coléoptères d'Europe commenced (finished 1868 by Léon Fairmaire).

=== 1858 ===
- Henri Louis Frederic de Saussure Mélanges Hyménoptérologiques. 1.67 p., 1 pl – also included in Mémoires de la Société de Genève.
- Ludwig Redtenbacher publishes Fauna Austriaca. Die Käfer, nach der analytischen Methode bearbeitet.

=== 1859 ===
- Hermann von Heinemann writes Die Schmetterlinge Deutschlands und der Schweiz. In English, "Butterflies of Germany and Switzerland". Completed 1877. The second volume on microlepidoptera is especially important.
- Charles Darwin Origin of Species London. Entomologists have differing views of this work. Best known for his theory of evolution through natural selection, Darwin is also a keen entomologist.
- Leander Czerny is born.
- The Museum of Comparative Zoology at Harvard is founded by Louis Agassiz.
- The Entomological Society of Philadelphia is established. In 1867, it was renamed the American Entomological Society, the earliest national organization in the biological sciences in the United States of America.
- Pierre Millière commenced Iconographie et description de Chenilles et Lépidoptères inédit; not completed until 1874. His collections of macrolepidoptera and Pyralidae are in Palais Coburg in Vienna. There are some of his microlepidoptera in the Natural History Museum, Leiden, but the bulk of his Microlepidoptera collection is in the Muséum national d'Histoire naturelle in Paris.
- The Russian Entomological Society is founded with Academician K.M. Baer as the first president.
- Ottmar Hofmann gives an inaugural dissertation, Ueber die Naturgeschichte der Psychiden, eine Insektengruppe aus der Ordnung der Lepidoptera.
- Charles Théophile Bruand d'Uzelle publishes Essai monographique sur le genre Coleophora in Annales de la société entomologique de France.

=== 1860 ===
- John Curtis Farm Insects being the natural history and economy of the insects injurious to the field crops of Great Britain and Ireland with suggestions for their destruction Glasgow, Blackie. Seminal work on economic entomology.
- Giovanni Passerini's Gli afidi con un prospetto dei generi ed alcune specie nuove Italiane, published at Parma
- Theodor Becker born.
- Franz Xaver Fieber Die europäischen Hemiptera

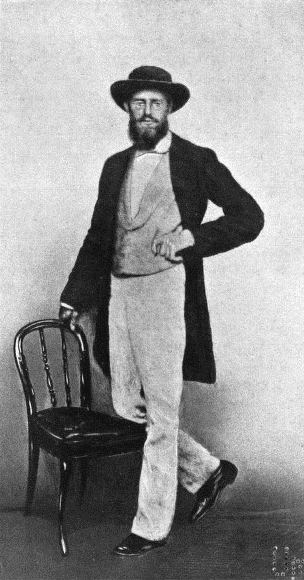
A. R. Wallace in Singapore

=== 1861 ===
- John Lawrence LeConte Classification of the Coleoptera of North America is published. LeConte is the most important American entomologist of the century.
- Otto Staudinger and Maximilian Ferdinand Wocke Catalog der Lepidopteren Europas
- Carl Gustav Carus Natur und Idee oder das Werdende und sein Gesetz. Eine philosophische Grundlage für die specielle Naturwissenschaft. Wien: Braunmüller. Important science philosophical work.
- Jørgen Matthias Christian Schiødte. De Metamorphosi Eleutheratorum Observationes. Bidrag til Insekterns Udviklingshistorie. Naturhistorisk Tiddsskrift commences. 13 parts completed 1883. Seminal work on larvae of Coleoptera.
- Museum Godeffroy opens in Hamburg.

=== 1863 ===
- Karl Friedrich Wilhelm Berge Schmetterlingsbuch Third edition of this 194-page popular classic work with 49 hand-coloured plates. Berge also wrote Käferbuch (1841). This work becomes an enduring classic. William Forsell Kirby uses its 61 plates for his 1889 European butterflies and moths. It was as B. J. Rebel's edition of Berge's Schmetterlingsbuch still a bestseller in 1949 and is now available as a CD.
- Entomological Society of Canada is founded.
- Sylvain Auguste de Marseul Catalogue des coléoptères d'Europe et du bassin de la Mediterranée en Afrique et en Asie A. Deyrolle, Paris., is published.

=== 1864 ===
- Francis Polkinghorne Pascoe Longicornia Malayana; or a descriptive catalogue of the species of the three longicorn families Lamiidae, Cerambycidae and Prionidae collected by Mr. A. R. Wallace in the Malay Archipelago. Transactions of the Entomological Society of London commences. This work is finished in 1869.
- Alexander Walker Scott, 1864-6 Australian Lepidoptera with their Transformations. A beautifully illustrated (by Harriet and Helena Scott) seminal work of Australian entomology.

First appearance of the Entomologist's Monthly Magazine in England together with the reappearance of the Entomologist indicates a surge of entomology in England.

- Zoological Record is started in London. Continues work of Hagen, and includes taxa other than insects.
- Carl Stål Hemiptera Africana. 1–4, Holmiae, Stockholm. [in Latin, textual descriptions, keys to genera] 1864–1866.
- Frédéric Jules Sichel wrote Catalogus specierum generis Scolia, an important text on Hymenoptera.

=== 1865 ===
- Alfred Russel Wallace On the Phenomena of Variation and Geographical Distribution as Illustrated by the Papilionidae of the Malayan Region (vol.25 Transactions of the Linnean Society of London). Seminal biogeographic and evolutionary work essentially laying out the principles of allopatric speciation.
- Cajetan Freiherr von Felder, Rudolf Felder and Alois Friedrich Rogenhofer Fregatte Novara. Lepidoptera. 1–3. commences.
- Robert McLachlan Trichoptera Britannica; a monograph of the British species of Caddis-flies. Transactions of the Entomological Society of London. (3) 5: 1–184
- Samuel Hubbard Scudder An inquiry into the zoological relation of the first discovered traces of fossil neuropterous insects in North America; with remarks on the different structure of wings of living Neuroptera. – Memoirs Read Before the Boston Society of Natural History. 1: 173–192 1865–1867

=== 1866 ===
- Josef Mik Beitrag zur Dipterenfauna des österreichischen Küstenlandes. Abh. Zool.-Bot. Ges. Wien 16:301–310, is published. Mik's first work on the Diptera.
- Carl Eduard Adolph Gerstaecker commenced Arthropoda, in Klassen und Ordnungen des Thierreichs, (Section Arthropoda, in Classes and Orders of the Animal Kingdom) in 1866. The work is finished in 1893.

=== 1867 ===
- Johannes Winnertz Beitrag zu einer Monographie der Sciarinen. Vienna.

=== 1868 ===
- August Emil Holmgren Hymenoptera, species novas descripsit. Kongliga Svenska Fregatten Eugenies resa omkring jorden: under befäl af C.A. Virgin, åren 1851–53. II Zoologi 1 Insecta pp. 391–442 pl. viii.
- Charles Valentine Riley is appointed to the office of entomologist of the State of Missouri.
- Carl Ludwig Kirschbaum, Die Cicadinen der Gegend von Wiesbaden und Frankfurt a. M. nebst einer Anzahl neuer oder schwer zu unterscheidender Arten aus anderen Gegenden Europas

=== 1869 ===
- Tord Tamerlan Teodor Thorell publishes European Spiders, followed by (in 1870) Synonymy of European Spiders, two works that significantly progress the taxonomy of spiders.
- La Società Entomologica Italiana is founded.
- Louis Pandelle Études monographique sur les staphylins européens de la tribu des Tachyporini Erichson. Annales de la Société Entomologique de France.
- Ferdinand Ferdinandovitsch Morawitz Die Bienen des Gouvernements von St. Petersburg. Trudy Russkago éntomologicheskago obshchestva 6: 27–71.
- Auguste Puton publishes Catalogue des hémiptères hétéroptères d'Europe Deyrolle, 1869

=== 1870 ===
- Thomas Ansell Marshall, Ichneumonidium Brittanicorum Catalogus. London

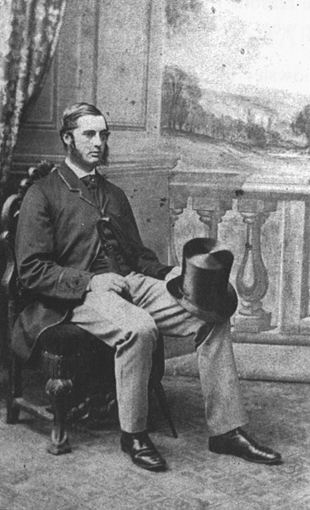
Frederick DuCane Godman

- Franz Pfaffenzeller publishes Neue Tineinen in Stettin Ent. Ztg. 31 (7–9) : 320–324

== 1870–1898 ==
=== 1871 ===
- Enrico Verson (1845–1927) founds the world's first silkworm experimental station in Italy.
- António Augusto Carvalho Monteiro meets Otto Staudinger in Dresden. He begins to build one of the biggest butterfly collections in the world.

=== 1872 ===
- Ferdinand Heinrich Hermann Strecker Lepidoptera, Rhopaloceres and Heteroceras, Indigenous and Exotic; with Descriptions and Colored Illustrations is published.

=== 1874 ===
- Robert McLachlan publishes the first volume of Monographic revision and synopsis of the Trichoptera of the European fauna (two volumes, 1874 and 1880).
- Achille Costa 1874. Fauna Salentina. Tip. Ed. Salentina, Lecce, Italia.
- Locust Plague of 1874 takes place in the Great Plains

=== 1875 ===
- Antonio Curò Saggio di un Catalogo dei Lepidotteri d'Italia commences (completed 1889).
- Eugène Anselme Sébastien Léon Desmarest Hymenoptéres in Encyclopédie d'Histoire Naturelle.
- Albert's swarm takes place in the U.S.

=== 1876 ===
- Augustus Radcliffe Grote publishes The effect of the glacial epoch upon the distribution of insects in North America.
- Cyrus Thomas appointed state entomologist of Illinois.
- Félicien Henry Caignart de Saulcy Species des Paussides, Clavigérides, Psélaphides & Scydménides de l'Europe et des pays circonvoisins. Bulletin de la Société d'histoire naturelle de Metz 14: 25–100, is published. Saulcy specialises in cave fauna.
- Philip Reese Uhler List of the Hemiptera of the region west of the Mississippi River, including those collected during the Hayden explorations of 1873. Bulletin of the United States Geological and Geographical Survey of the Territories 1:267–361 is published.
- Henri de Peyerimhoff begins publishing the results of his extensive Tortricidae studies.

=== 1877 ===
- United States Entomological Commission established by Congress.

=== 1878 ===
- Charles Valentine Riley (1843–1895) organises the first government agricultural entomology service in the United States of America.
- Persephone butterfly fossil found in Florissant Fossil Beds by Charlotte Hill
- Lower Mississippi Valley yellow fever epidemic

=== 1879 ===
- Biologia Centrali-Americana (1879–1915) is commenced by Osbert Salvin and Frederick DuCane Godman. This is a 52-volume encyclopedia on the natural history of Central America.
- Souvenirs entomologiques by Jean-Henri Fabre commences (ended 1907).
- Adolfo Targioni Tozzetti, Notizie e indicazioni sulla malattia del pidocchio della vite o della fillossera (Phylloxera vastatrix). Rome. Typography Eredi Botta

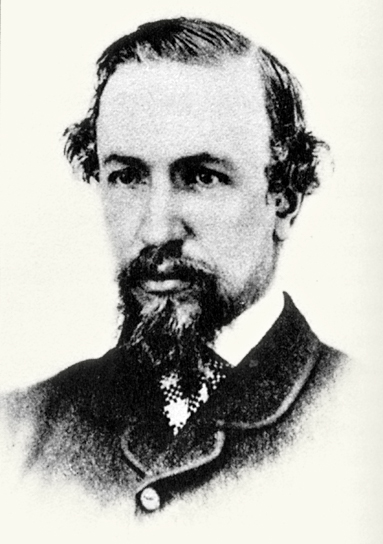
Osbert Salvin.

=== 1880 ===
- Edouard Piaget publishes Les pédiculines: Essay monographique. Brill, Leiden
- Jules Desbrochers des Loges, a coleopterist establishes an insect dealership at first based in Vitry-aux-Loges.

=== 1881 ===
- Matthew Cooke Treatise on the Insects Injurious to Fruit and Fruit Trees of the State of California, and Remedies Recommended for Their Extermination. Sacramento: State Office: J. D. Young, Supt. State Printing, 1881. A pioneering work of American entomology.
- John Henry Comstock becomes professor of entomology at Cornell University.
- Henri Gadeau de Kerville Les Insectes phosphorescents : notes complémentaires et bibliographie générale (anatomie physiologie et biologie) : avec quatre planches chromolithographiées, Rouen, L. Deshays, published.
- Franciscus J.M. Heylaerts publishes Essai d'une monographie des Psychidae de la faune européenne. Bulletin de la Société entomologique de Belgique 25:29–73.

=== 1882 ===
- Peter Cameron, A Monograph of the British Phytophagous Hymenoptera 1893 Ray Society commences. A four-volume work is completed in 1893.

=== 1883 ===
- Friedrich Moritz Brauer Die Zweiflügler des Kaiserlichen Museums zu Wien. III. Systematische Studien auf Grundlage der Dipteren-Larven. Seminal work of Dipterology.
- Charles Lionel Augustus de Nicéville with George Frederick Leycester Marshall begins Butterflies of India, Burmah and Ceylon, a three-volume work is completed in 1890.

=== 1884 ===
- Nicholas Mikhailovich Les Lépidoptères de la Transcaucasie. Ire Partie. In: Mémoires sur les Lépidoptères. Stassulewitsch, St.-Pétersbourg, Vol. 1 (1–92, pl. 1–50.
- Joannes Charles Melchior Chatin Morphologie comparée des pièces maxillaires, mandibulaires et labiales chez les insectes broyeurs

=== 1886 ===
- Deutsches Entomologisches Institut (DEI, German Entomological Institute) founded.
- Carl Gustav Alexander Brischke publishes Die Hymenopteren des Bernsteins.
- Mariano de la Paz Graells y de la Agüera Entomología Judicial. Rev. Progr. Cienc. Exac. Fís. Nat. Madrid, 21:458–471. A founding work of forensic entomology.

=== 1887 ===
- Karl Alfred Poppius publishes Finlands Dendrometridae.

=== 1898 ===
- Liverpool School of Tropical Medicine is founded, the first of its kind in the world. Between 1898 and 1913 the school dispatches 32 expeditions to the tropics, including Sierra Leone, the Congo and the Amazon.
- Fritz Müller publishes Über die Vortheile der Mimicry bei Schmetterlingen in Zoologischer Anzeiger 1, 54–55.

=== 1889 ===
- The Entomological Society of America (ESA) is founded.
- William Lucas Distant A monograph of oriental Cicadidae commenced, a seven-part monograph with fifteen hand-coloured lithographed plates is finished in 1892.
- Julius Weise Naturgeschichte der Insecten Deutschland. Erste Abtheilung Coleoptera. Sechster Band. Berlin, Nicolaische Verlags-Buchhandlung R. Stricker is published.
- Karl August Teich publishes a study of Lepidoptera of the Baltic region. Baltische Lepidopteren-Fauna. I-IX, 1–152. Riga.
- Edwin Felix Thomas Atkinson published Catalogue of the Insecta. Order Rhynchota (pars).
- Margaret Fountaine elected a Fellow of the Entomological Society of London.

=== 1891 ===
- Grigory Grum-Grshimailo Le Pamir et la faune lépidoptérologique. Mém. lépidop. Ed. N.M.Romanoff is published.
- Louis Gabriel d'Antessanty published Catalogue des Hémiptères-Hétéroptères de l'Aube Dufour-Bouquot Plaquette Grand In-8 Broché Troyes.
- Sigmund Exner Die Physiologie der facettierten Augen von Krebsen und Insekten describes the compound eye physiology of insects and crustaceans.

=== 1892 ===
- Miscellanea Entomologica is established.
- Étienne-Jules Marey 1892. Le vol des insectes étudié par la chronophotographie. In English, The flight of insects studied by chronophotography.

=== 1893 ===
- George Francis Hampson publishes The Lepidoptera Heterocera of Ceylon (1893) as parts 8 and 9 of Illustrations of Typical Specimens of Lepidoptera Heterocera of the British Museum. He then commences work on The Fauna of British India, Including Ceylon and Burma. Moths (4 vols 1892–1896).
- William Harris Ashmead publishes Monograph of the North American Proctotrupidae in the Bulletin of the U.S. National Museum.

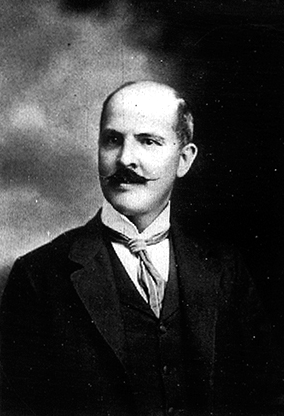
William Harris Ashmead.

- Philip Powell Calvert publishes Catalogue of the Odonata (dragonflies) of the Vicinity of Philadelphia, with an Introduction to the Study of this Group, a model for later regional studies.
- Eleanor Anne Ormerod Manual of injurious insects with methods of prevention and remedy for their attacks to food crops, forest trees and fruit: to which is appended a short introduction to entomology is published.
- Maurice Noualhier 1893. Voyage de M. Ch. Alluaud aux iles Canaries (Novembre 1889 – Juin 1890). 2e Memoire. Hémiptères Gymnocerates & Hydrocorises. Annales de la Société Entomologique de France 52:5–18.

=== 1894 ===
- Jean Pierre Mégnin publishes La Faune des Cadavres. Applications de l'Entomologie à la Médecine Légale. Corpse Fauna: Application of Entomology to Legal Medicine. Encyclopedie Scientifique des Aides-Memoires, Masson et Gauthier-Villars, Paris, 214 pp.
- Ferdinand Kowarz 1894 Catalogus insectorum faunae bohemicae. -II. Fliegen (Diptera) is published.
- Bureau of Entomology (U.S.A.) founded.
- Ernst Haeckel Die systematische Phylogenie, "Systematic Phylogeny", published.

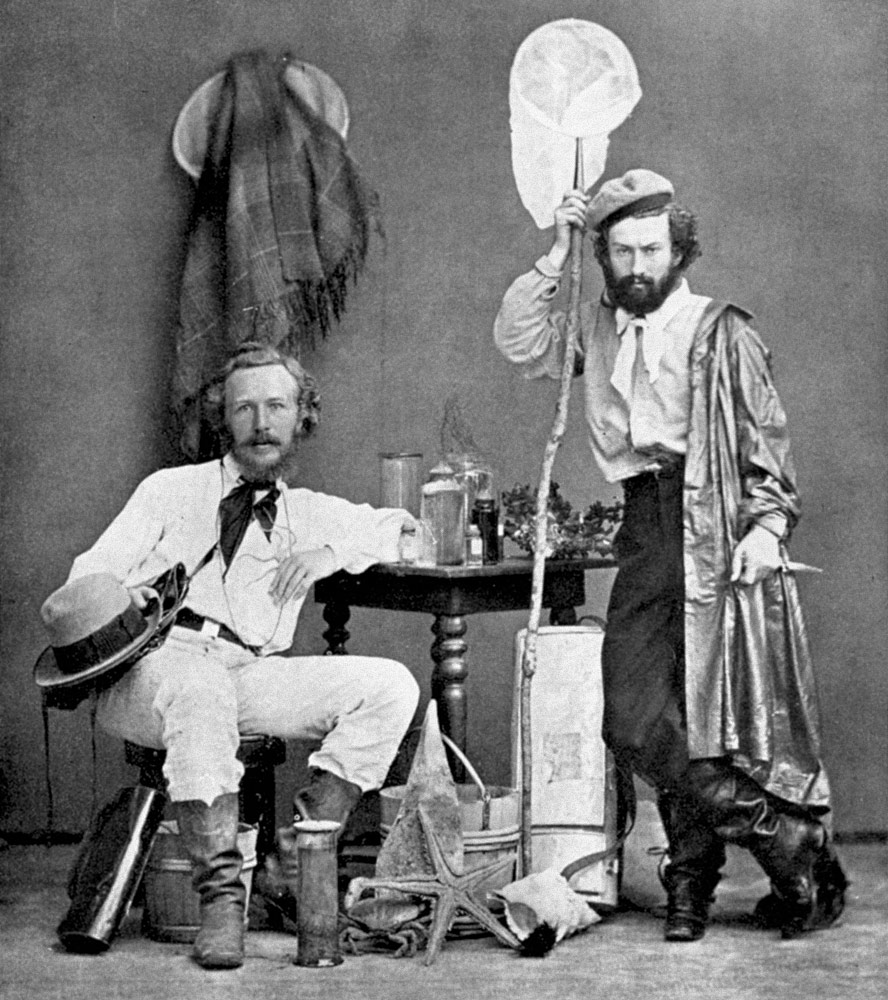
Ernst Haeckel (left) with Nicholai Miklukho-Maklai, his assistant, in the Canaries, 1866.

=== 1895 ===
- Alpheus Spring Packard First volume of Monograph of the Bombycine Moths of North America is published. (Parts 2 and 3 1905 and 1915). Packard was a vocal proponent of the Neo-Lamarckian theory of evolution.
- Emil Weiske begins collecting in New Guinea.

=== 1897 ===
- Charles E. Woodworth is born.
- Charles Thomas Bingham The Fauna of British India, Including Ceylon and Burma. Hymenoptera. 1. Wasps and Bees is published.
- Royal Museum for Central Africa is established.

=== 1898 ===
- Gabriel Strobl Fauna diptera Bosne, Hercegovine I Dalmacie. Glasn. Zemalj. Muz. Bosni Herceg. 10: 87–466, 562–616. In Serbian this is the first in a series of works on the Diptera of the Balkans.
- French scientist Paul-Louis Simond establishes the rat flea as the vector of bubonic plague.

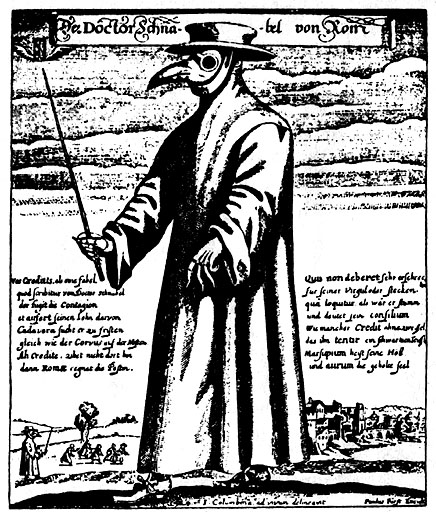
"Der Doktor Schnabel von Rom" (English: "Doctor Beak of Rome") engraving by Paul Fürst (after J Columbina). The beak is a primitive gas mask, stuffed with substances (such as spices and herbs) thought to ward off the plague.

== See also ==
- Timeline of entomology — for a list of other available time periods
- List of entomologists

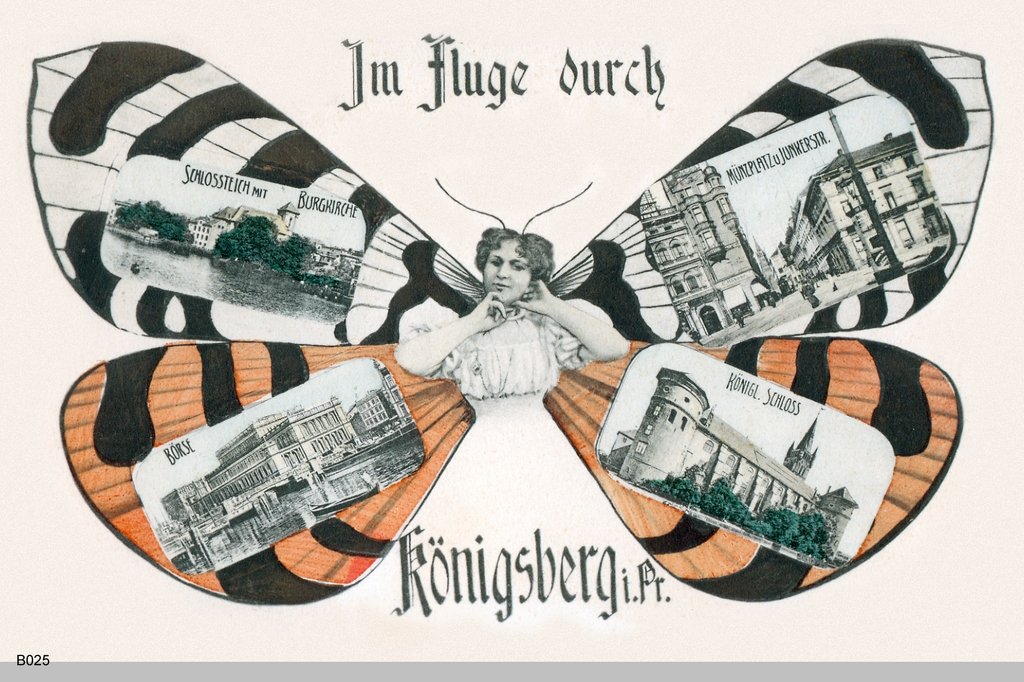
Postcard 1884
