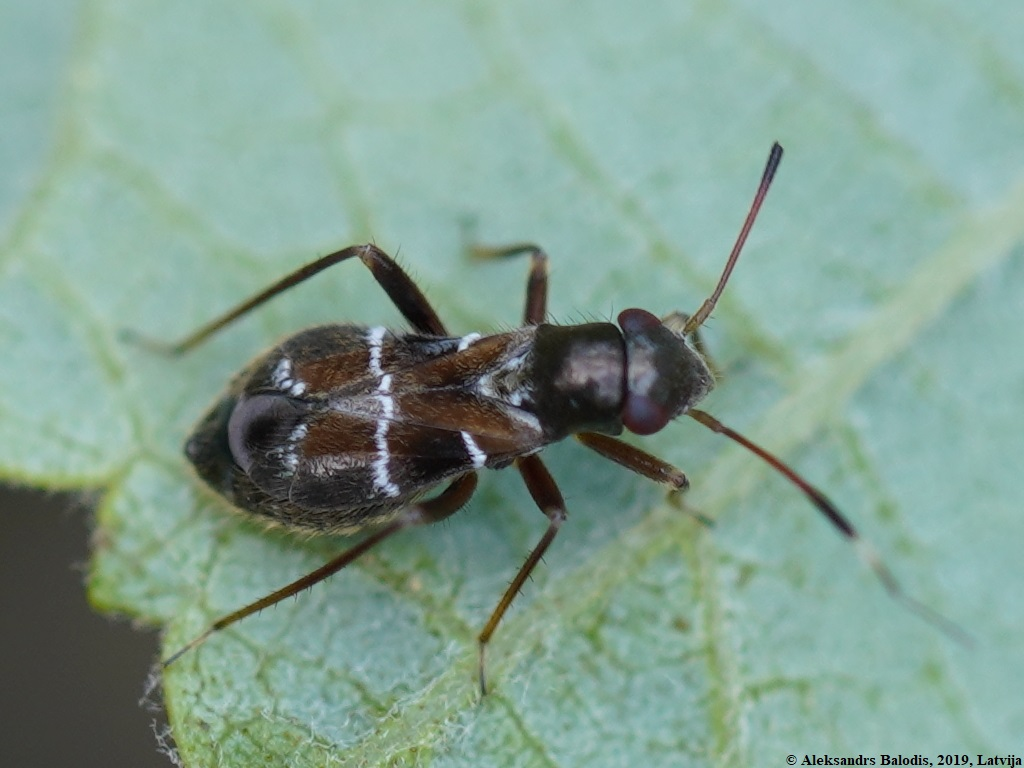

Scientific classification
- Kingdom: Animalia
- Phylum: Arthropoda
- Class: Insecta
- Order: Hemiptera
- Suborder: Heteroptera
- Family: Miridae
- Tribe: Pilophorini
- Genus: Pilophorus
- Species: P. confusus

Binomial name
- Pilophorus confusus Kirschbaum, 1856

= Pilophorus confusus =

Species of true bug

Pilophorus confusus is a species of plant bug in the family Miridae. It is found in Europe, northern Asia (excluding China) and North America.
