= Pilophorus tibialis =

Scientific classification
- Kingdom: Animalia
- Phylum: Arthropoda
- Class: Insecta
- Order: Hemiptera
- Suborder: Heteroptera
- Family: Miridae
- Tribe: Pilophorini
- Genus: Pilophorus
- Species: P. tibialis

Binomial name
- Pilophorus tibialis Van Duzee, 1918

Synonyms
- Pilophorus desertinus Knight, 1968; Pilophorus hesperus Knight, 1968; Pilophorus jezzardi Knight, 1968; Pilophorus mexicanus Knight, 1973; Pilophorus microsetosus Knight, 1968

Species of true bug

Pilophorus tibialis is a species of plant bug in the family Miridae. It is found in Central America and North America.
