= Pilophorus strobicola =

Scientific classification
- Kingdom: Animalia
- Phylum: Arthropoda
- Class: Insecta
- Order: Hemiptera
- Suborder: Heteroptera
- Family: Miridae
- Tribe: Pilophorini
- Genus: Pilophorus
- Species: P. strobicola

Binomial name
- Pilophorus strobicola Knight, 1926

Species of true bug

Pilophorus strobicola is a species of plant bug in the family Miridae. It is found in North America.
