= Scrobipalpopsis madiae =

Scientific classification
- Kingdom: Animalia
- Phylum: Arthropoda
- Clade: Pancrustacea
- Class: Insecta
- Order: Lepidoptera
- Family: Gelechiidae
- Genus: Scrobipalpopsis
- Species: S. madiae

Binomial name
- Scrobipalpopsis madiae Powell & Povolný, 2001

Species of moth

Scrobipalpopsis madiae is a moth in the family Gelechiidae. It was described by Powell and Povolný in 2001. It is found in North America, where it has been recorded from California.

The length of the forewings is about 6.6 mm.

The larvae feed on Madia species, possibly including Madia madioides.
