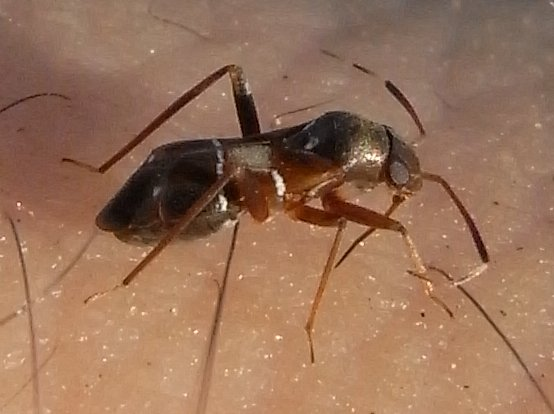
- Pilophorus perplexus

Scientific classification
- Kingdom: Animalia
- Phylum: Arthropoda
- Class: Insecta
- Order: Hemiptera
- Suborder: Heteroptera
- Family: Miridae
- Tribe: Pilophorini
- Genus: Pilophorus; Hahn, 1826

= Pilophorus (bug) =

Genus of true bugs

Pilophorus is a genus of plant bug. It is the type genus for the Pilophorini tribe.

== Species ==
- Pilophorus americanus Poppius, 1914
- Pilophorus amoenus Uhler, 1887
- Pilophorus balli Knight, 1968
- Pilophorus barbiger Yasunaga & Schuh, 2013
- Pilophorus brunneus Poppius, 1914
- Pilophorus buenoi Poppius, 1914
- Pilophorus cembroides Schuh & Schwartz, 1988
- Pilophorus chiricahuae Knight, 1968
- Pilophorus cinnamopterus (Kirschbaum, 1856)
- Pilophorus clavatus (Linnaeus, 1767)
- Pilophorus clavicornis Poppius, 1914
- Pilophorus concolor Schuh & Schwartz, 1988
- Pilophorus confusus Kirschbaum, 1856
- Pilophorus crassipes Heidemann, 1892
- Pilophorus diffusus Knight, 1968
- Pilophorus discretus Van Duzee, 1918
- Pilophorus dislocatus Knight, 1968
- Pilophorus exiguus Poppius, 1914
- Pilophorus explanatus Schuh & Schwartz, 1988
- Pilophorus floridanus Knight, 1973
- Pilophorus furvus Knight, 1923
- Pilophorus fuscipennis Knight, 1926
- Pilophorus geminus Knight, 1968
- Pilophorus giraffoides Yasunaga & Schuh, 2013
- Pilophorus gracilis Uhler, 1895
- Pilophorus heidemanni Poppius, 1914
- Pilophorus henryi Schuh & Schwartz, 1988
- Pilophorus juniperi Knight, 1923
- Pilophorus laetus Heidemann, 1892
- Pilophorus longisetosus Knight, 1968
- Pilophorus minutus Knight, 1973
- Pilophorus nasicus Knight, 1926
- Pilophorus neoclavatus Schuh & Schwartz, 1988
- Pilophorus nevadensis Knight, 1968
- Pilophorus perplexus Douglas & Scott, 1988
- Pilophorus piceicola Knight, 1926
- Pilophorus portentosus Yasunaga & Schuh, 2013
- Pilophorus salicis Knight, 1968
- Pilophorus schaffneri Schuh & Schwartz, 1988
- Pilophorus schwartzi Reuter, 1909
- Pilophorus setiger Knight, 1941
- Pilophorus stonedahli Schuh & Schwartz, 1988
- Pilophorus strobicola Knight, 1926
- Pilophorus taxodii Knight, 1941
- Pilophorus tibialis Van Duzee, 1918
- Pilophorus tomentosus Van Duzee, 1918
- Pilophorus uhleri Knight, 1923
- Pilophorus vicarius Poppius, 1914
- Pilophorus walshii Uhler, 1887
