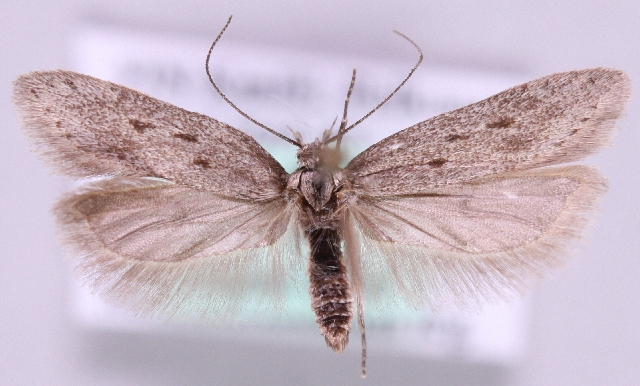
- Scrobipalpopsis petasitis

Scientific classification
- Kingdom: Animalia
- Phylum: Arthropoda
- Clade: Pancrustacea
- Class: Insecta
- Order: Lepidoptera
- Family: Gelechiidae
- Subfamily: Gelechiinae
- Tribe: Gnorimoschemini
- Genus: Scrobipalpopsis; Povolný, 1967

= Scrobipalpopsis =

Genus of moths

Scrobipalpopsis is a genus of moth in the family Gelechiidae.

== Species ==
- Scrobipalpopsis arnicella (Clarke, 1942)
- Scrobipalpopsis interposita Powell & Povolný, 2001
- Scrobipalpopsis madiae Powell & Povolný, 2001
- Scrobipalpopsis petasitis (Pfaffenzeller, 1867)
- Scrobipalpopsis petrella (Busck, 1915)
- Scrobipalpopsis tetradymiella (Busck, 1903)
