= Scrobipalpopsis arnicella =

Scientific classification
- Domain: Eukaryota
- Kingdom: Animalia
- Phylum: Arthropoda
- Class: Insecta
- Order: Lepidoptera
- Family: Gelechiidae
- Genus: Scrobipalpopsis
- Species: S. arnicella

Binomial name
- Scrobipalpopsis arnicella (Clarke, 1942)

Synonyms
- Gnorimoschema arnicella Clarke, 1942; Ptycerata arnicella

Species of moth

Scrobipalpopsis arnicella is a moth in the family Gelechiidae. It was described by John Frederick Gates Clarke in 1942. It is found in western North America, where it has been recorded from Washington and California.

The wingspan is 14–15 mm. The forewings are pale cinereous, lightly shaded with pale brown and profusely, but finely, irrorated (sprinkled) with fuscous. There are five blackish-fuscous spots. The hindwings are light gray, darker apically.

The larvae feed on Arnica cordifolia. They roll the leaves of their host plant.
