= Scrobipalpopsis petrella =

Scientific classification
- Domain: Eukaryota
- Kingdom: Animalia
- Phylum: Arthropoda
- Class: Insecta
- Order: Lepidoptera
- Family: Gelechiidae
- Genus: Scrobipalpopsis
- Species: S. petrella

Binomial name
- Scrobipalpopsis petrella (Busck, 1915)

Synonyms
- Gnorimoschema petrella Busck, 1915; Ptycerata petrella

Species of moth

Scrobipalpopsis petrella is a moth in the family Gelechiidae. It was described by August Busck in 1915. It is found in North America, where it has been recorded from New Hampshire, Illinois, Maine and Alberta.

The wingspan is about 17 mm. The forewings are white, liberally and evenly dusted with brownish fuscous atoms and with three small, indistinct, black dots, one on the middle of the cell, one obliquely below on the fold and one at the end of the cell. The hindwings are dark fuscous.
