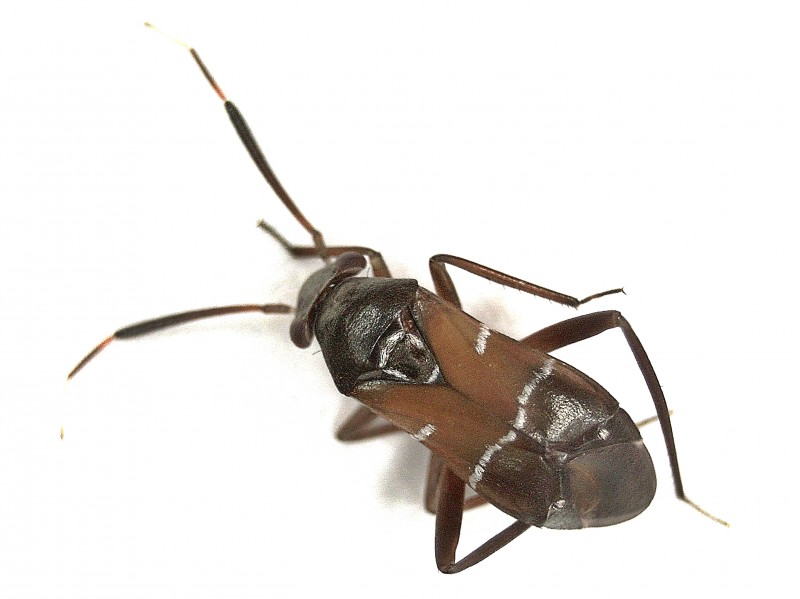

Scientific classification
- Kingdom: Animalia
- Phylum: Arthropoda
- Class: Insecta
- Order: Hemiptera
- Suborder: Heteroptera
- Family: Miridae
- Genus: Pilophorus
- Species: P. cinnamopterus

Binomial name
- Pilophorus cinnamopterus (Kirschbaum, 1856)

= Pilophorus cinnamopterus =

Species of beetle

Pilophorus cinnamopterus is a species of true bug in the Miridae family that can be found everywhere in Europe (except for Albania, Azores, Canary Islands, Cyprus, Faroe Islands, Iceland, Lithuania, Moldova, Madeira, Novaya Zemlya, Portugal and in the states of former Yugoslavia except Slovenia and Croatia). Further East across the Palearctic it is found in Asia minor and the Caspian region then to Eastern Siberia.

== Description ==
The species is brown coloured, is 4.5 millimetres (0.18 in) long, and have silver coloured bands on forewings which are hairy as well. Unlike Pilophorus perplexus their forewings are orange-brown coloured. The species feed on aphids.
