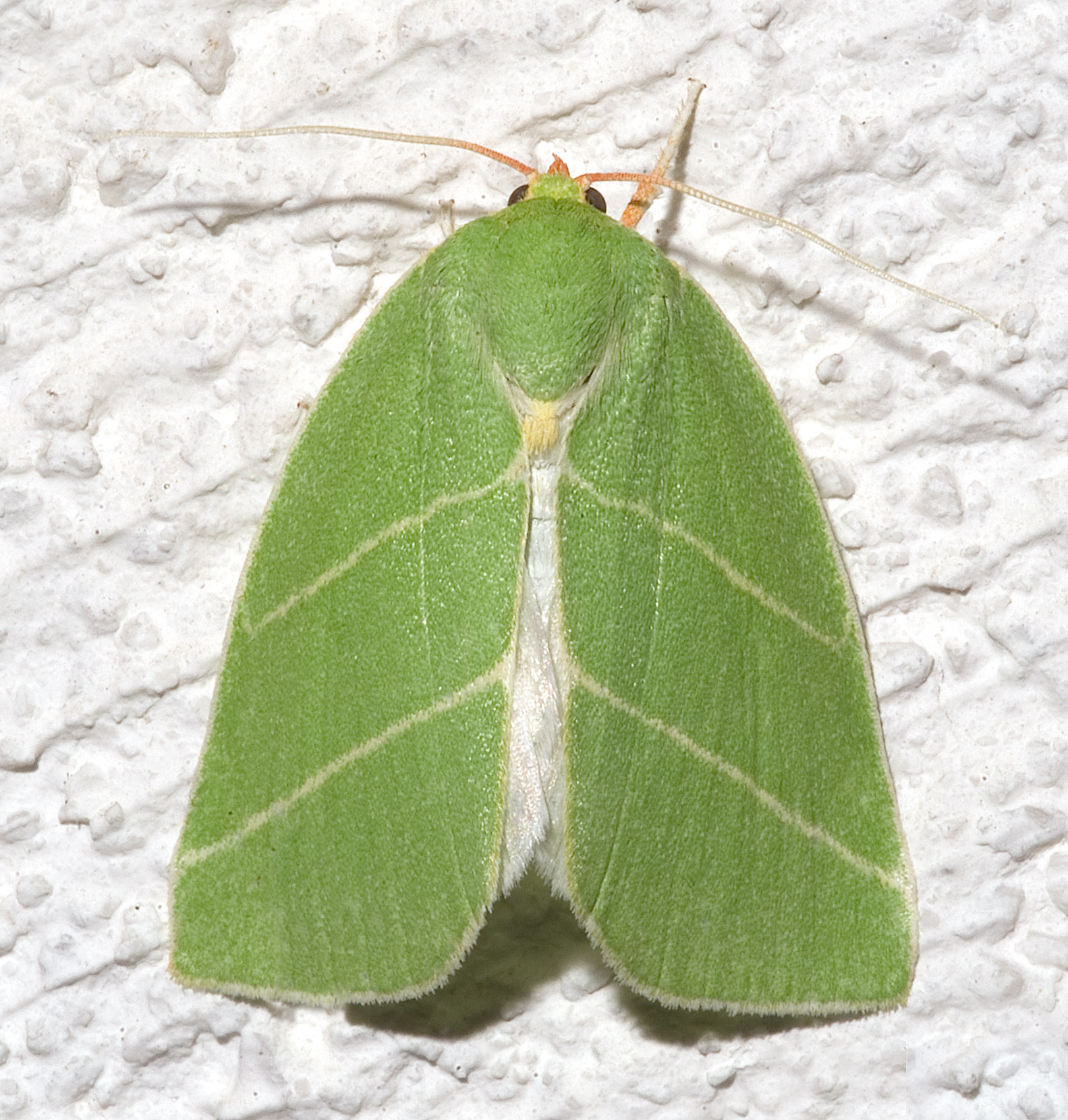
- Bena bicolorana

Scientific classification
- Domain: Eukaryota
- Kingdom: Animalia
- Phylum: Arthropoda
- Class: Insecta
- Order: Lepidoptera
- Superfamily: Noctuoidea
- Family: Nolidae
- Tribe: Sarrothripini
- Genus: Bena; Billberg, 1820

Synonyms
- Hylophilina Warren, 1913

= Bena (moth) =

Genus of moths

Bena is a genus of moths in the family Nolidae. The genus was erected by Gustaf Johan Billberg in 1820.

== Species ==
- Bena bicolorana (Fuessly, 1775) Europe, Turkey
- Bena africana (Warren, 1913) Tunisia
