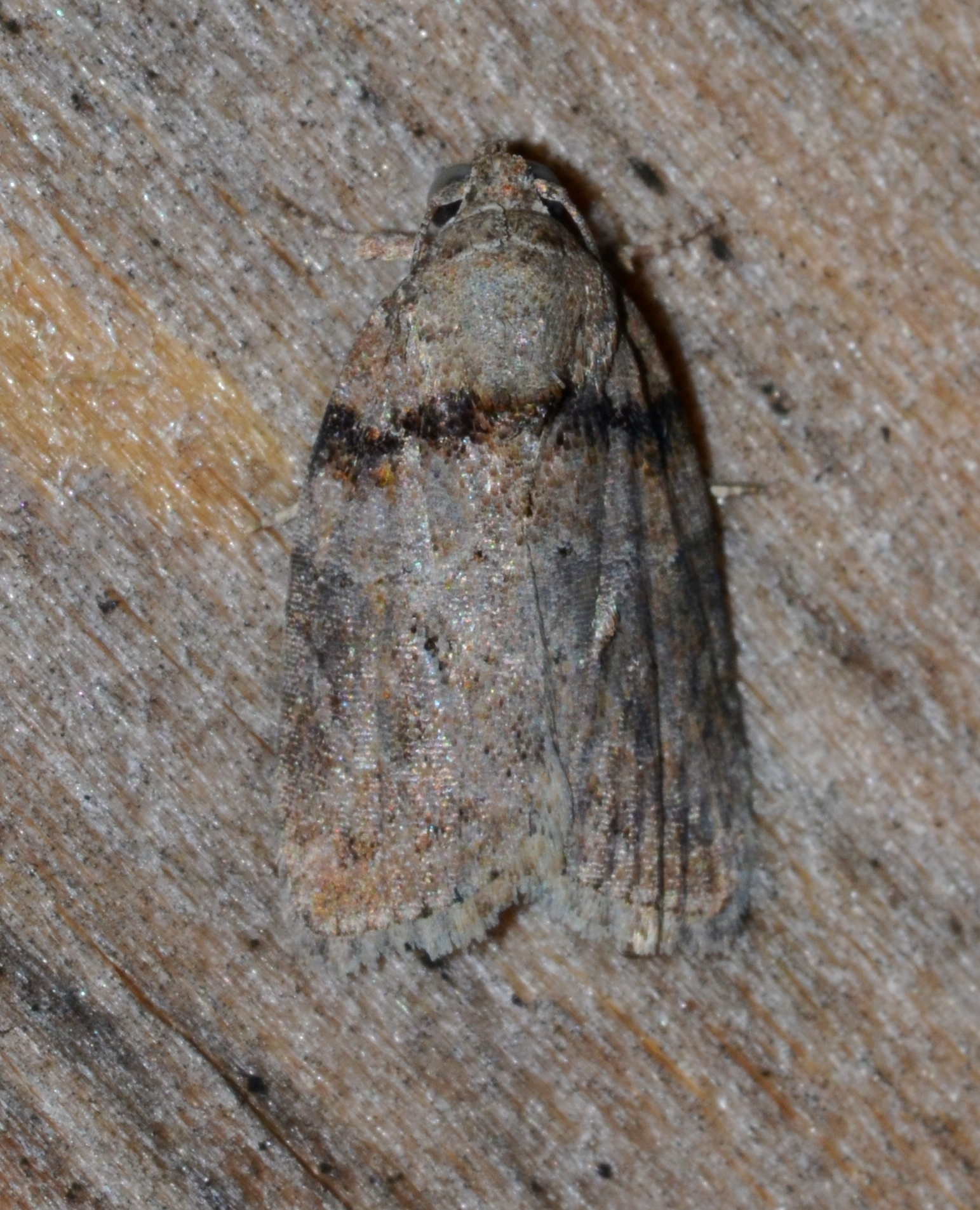

Scientific classification
- Domain: Eukaryota
- Kingdom: Animalia
- Phylum: Arthropoda
- Class: Insecta
- Order: Lepidoptera
- Superfamily: Noctuoidea
- Family: Nolidae
- Genus: Garella
- Species: G. nilotica

Binomial name
- Garella nilotica (Rogenhofer, 1881)

Synonyms
- Sarrothripus nilotica Rogenhofer, 1882; Characoma nilotica; Paraxia chamaeleon Möschler, 1890; Clettharra littora Bethune-Baker, 1894; Thalpochares laurea H. Druce, 1898; Nycteola proteella Dyar, 1898; Characoma nilotica nigronotata Warren, 1913; Characoma nilotica macula Warren, 1913; Characoma nilotica basibrunnea Warren, 1913; Characoma albifascia Draudt, 1935

= Garella nilotica =

Species of moth

Garella nilotica, the black-olive caterpillar or bungee caterpillar, is a moth of the family Nolidae. It was described by Alois Friedrich Rogenhofer in 1881. It has a pantropical distribution, including the eastern North America (from Ontario, Quebec, Nova Scotia and New York south to Florida and Texas), the Caribbean, the Iberian Peninsula, Australia, Guam, Fiji, Samoa, the Galápagos Islands and the Chagos Archipelago.

The wingspan is about 15 mm.

The larvae feed on various trees and shrubs in at least five families of broad-leaved plants, including Cynometra, Heritiera, Mangifera, Terminalia, Rhododendron, Bucida (including Bucida buceras), Canocarpus, Olea, Prunus, Salix and Tamarix species.
