= Scrobipalpopsis tetradymiella =

Scientific classification
- Domain: Eukaryota
- Kingdom: Animalia
- Phylum: Arthropoda
- Class: Insecta
- Order: Lepidoptera
- Family: Gelechiidae
- Genus: Scrobipalpopsis
- Species: S. tetradymiella

Binomial name
- Scrobipalpopsis tetradymiella (Busck, 1903)

Synonyms
- Gnorimoschema tetradymiella Busck, 1903; Ptycerata tetradymiella

Species of moth

Scrobipalpopsis tetradymiella is a moth in the family Gelechiidae. It was described by August Busck in 1903. It is found in North America, where it has been recorded from California, Arizona and Nevada.

The wingspan is 15.5–20 mm. The forewings are whitish, evenly and thickly overlaid with gray and fuscous scales giving the species a pepper and salt appearance. Toward the apex, the veins are slightly indicated by nearly unsprinkled whitish thin lines, with their interspaces rather more overlaid with dark scales than the rest of the wing. The hindwings are nearly transparent, light gray with silvery reflections.

The larvae feed on Tetradymia canescens, feeding from within stem galls.
