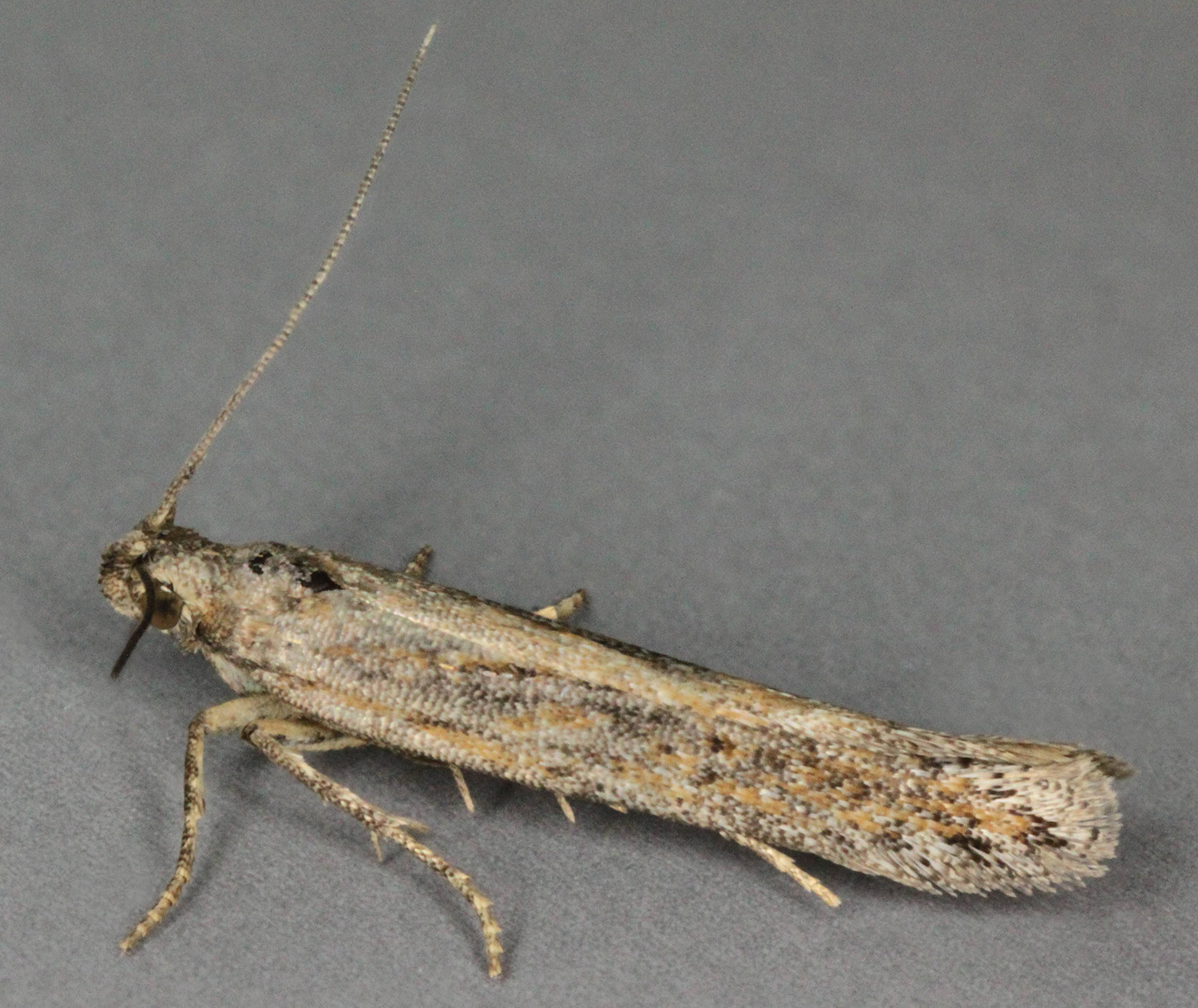

Scientific classification
- Domain: Eukaryota
- Kingdom: Animalia
- Phylum: Arthropoda
- Class: Insecta
- Order: Lepidoptera
- Family: Gelechiidae
- Genus: Scrobipalpa
- Species: S. samadensis

Binomial name
- Scrobipalpa samadensis (Pfaffenzeller, 1870)

Synonyms
- Gelechia samadensis Paffenzeller, 1870; Gelechia plantaginella Stainton, 1883; Gnorimoschema plantaginella; Lita plantaginella; Lita brunhildae Schawerda, 1921; Lita zimmermanni Zimmermann, 1923; Lita plantaginella var. mariae Zimmermann, 1926; Lita testacella Rebel, 1935; Gelechia echo Meyrick, 1937

= Scrobipalpa samadensis =

Species of moth

Scrobipalpa samadensis, the buck's-horn groundling, is a moth of the family Gelechiidae. It is found in most of Europe and Russia (the southern Urals).

The wingspan is 13–15 mm (0.51–0.59 in).The head is grey, face whitish. Terminal joint of palpi as long as second. Forewings brown; veins and costa grey-whitish, suffusedly irrorated withdark fuscous; dorsum sometimes lighter; stigmata blackish, indistinct, first discal beyond plical; sometimes dark costal spots near base, or a dark central longitudinal suffusion; faint costal and tornal whitish spots at 3/4, sometimes obsolete blackish terminal spots between veins. Hindwings 1, pale grey. The larva dull yellowish; dorsal, subdorsal, and spiracular lines sometimes faintly pinkish; dots black; head brown; plate of 2 black.

Adults have been recorded on wing from June to August.

The larvae feed on Plantago coronopus, Plantago lanceolata and Plantago maritima. The young larvae mine the leaves of their host plant.
