= Pilophorus walshii =

Scientific classification
- Domain: Eukaryota
- Kingdom: Animalia
- Phylum: Arthropoda
- Class: Insecta
- Order: Hemiptera
- Suborder: Heteroptera
- Family: Miridae
- Genus: Pilophorus
- Species: P. walshii

Binomial name
- Pilophorus walshii Uhler, 1887

Species of true bug

Pilophorus walshii is a species of plant bug in the family Miridae. It is found in North America. This species is known to feed on Honey locust foliage.
