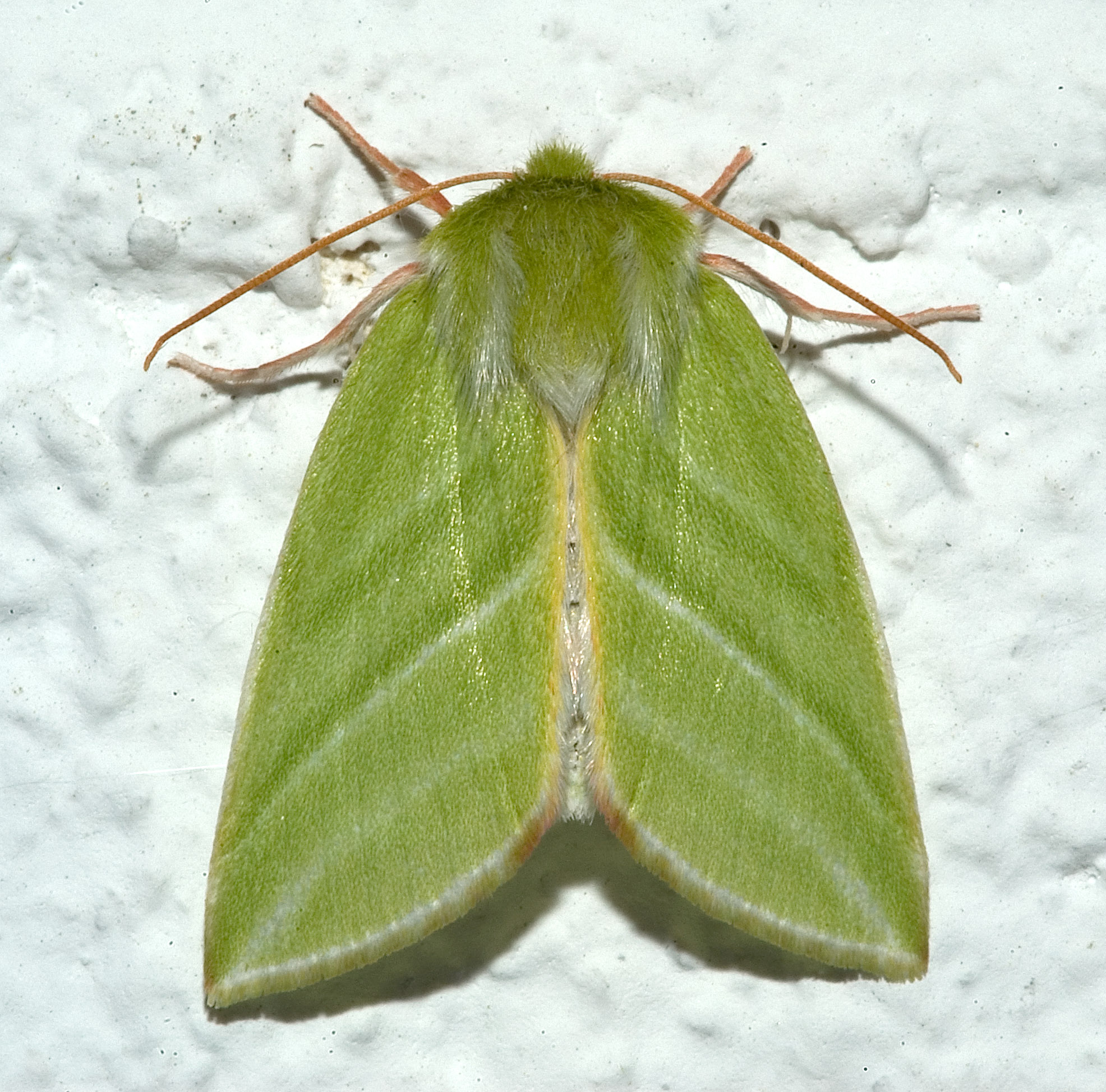

Scientific classification
- Kingdom: Animalia
- Phylum: Arthropoda
- Class: Insecta
- Order: Lepidoptera
- Superfamily: Noctuoidea
- Family: Nolidae
- Genus: Pseudoips
- Species: P. prasinana

Binomial name
- Pseudoips prasinana (Linnaeus, 1758)

Synonyms
- Phalaena prasinana Linnaeus, 1758; Pyralis fagana Fabricius, 1781; Pyralis sylvana Fabricius, 1794; Hylophila fiorii Constantini, 1911; Hylophila japonica Warren, 1913; Halias quercana; Pseudoips fagana

= Pseudoips prasinana =

Species of moth

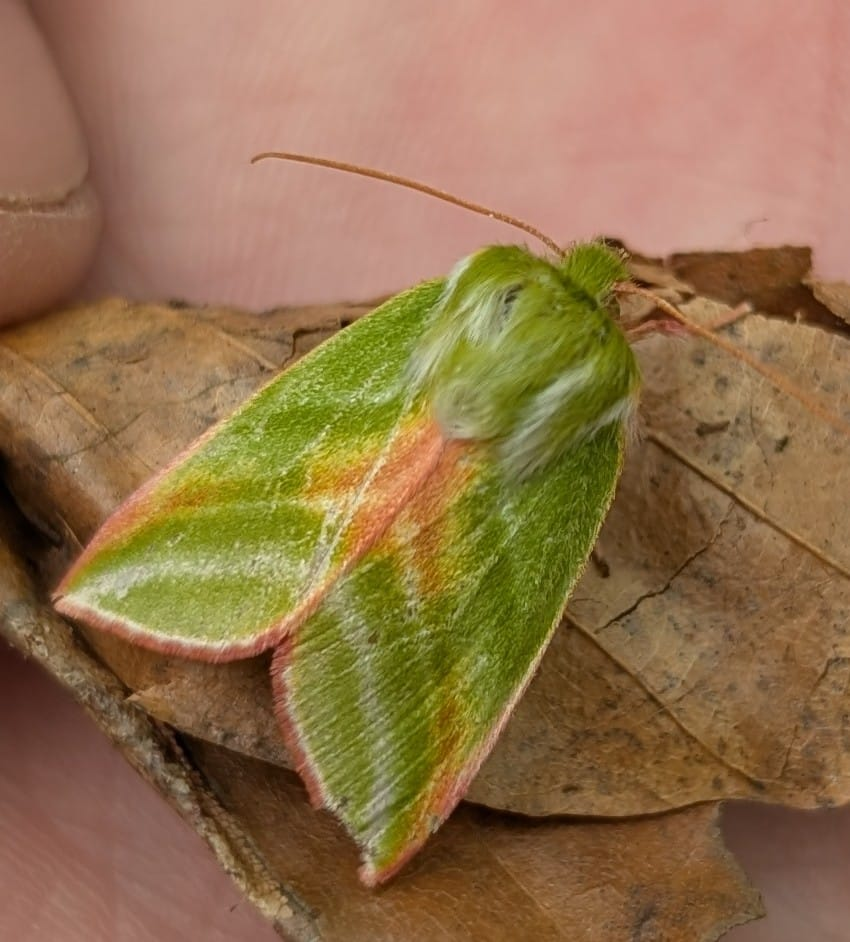

Pseudoips prasinana, the green silver-lines, is a moth of the family Nolidae, common in wooded regions, and having a wingspan of 30–35 mm. It is found in the Palearctic realm (north and central Europe, Russia, Siberia, Korea, Japan).

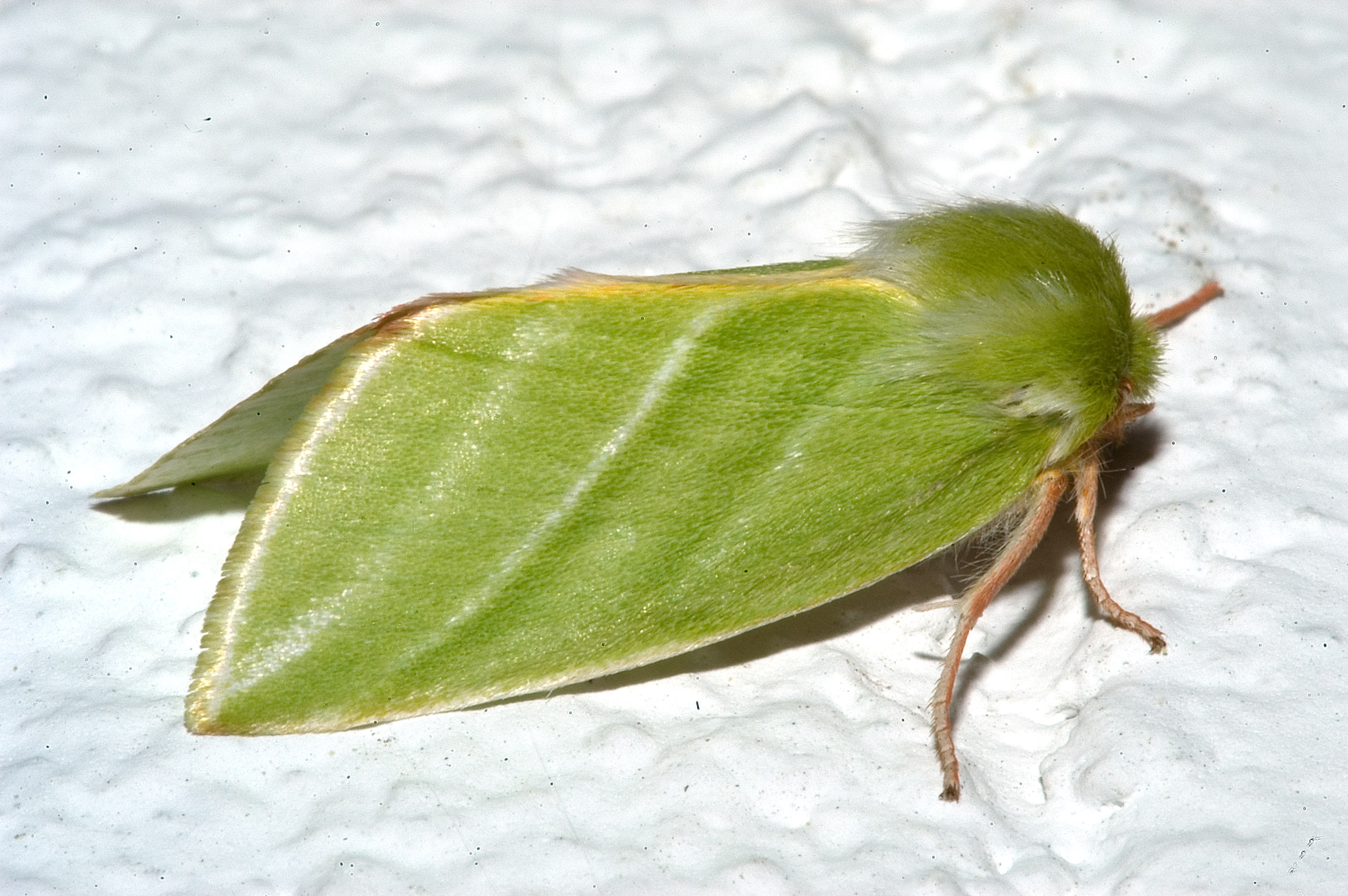

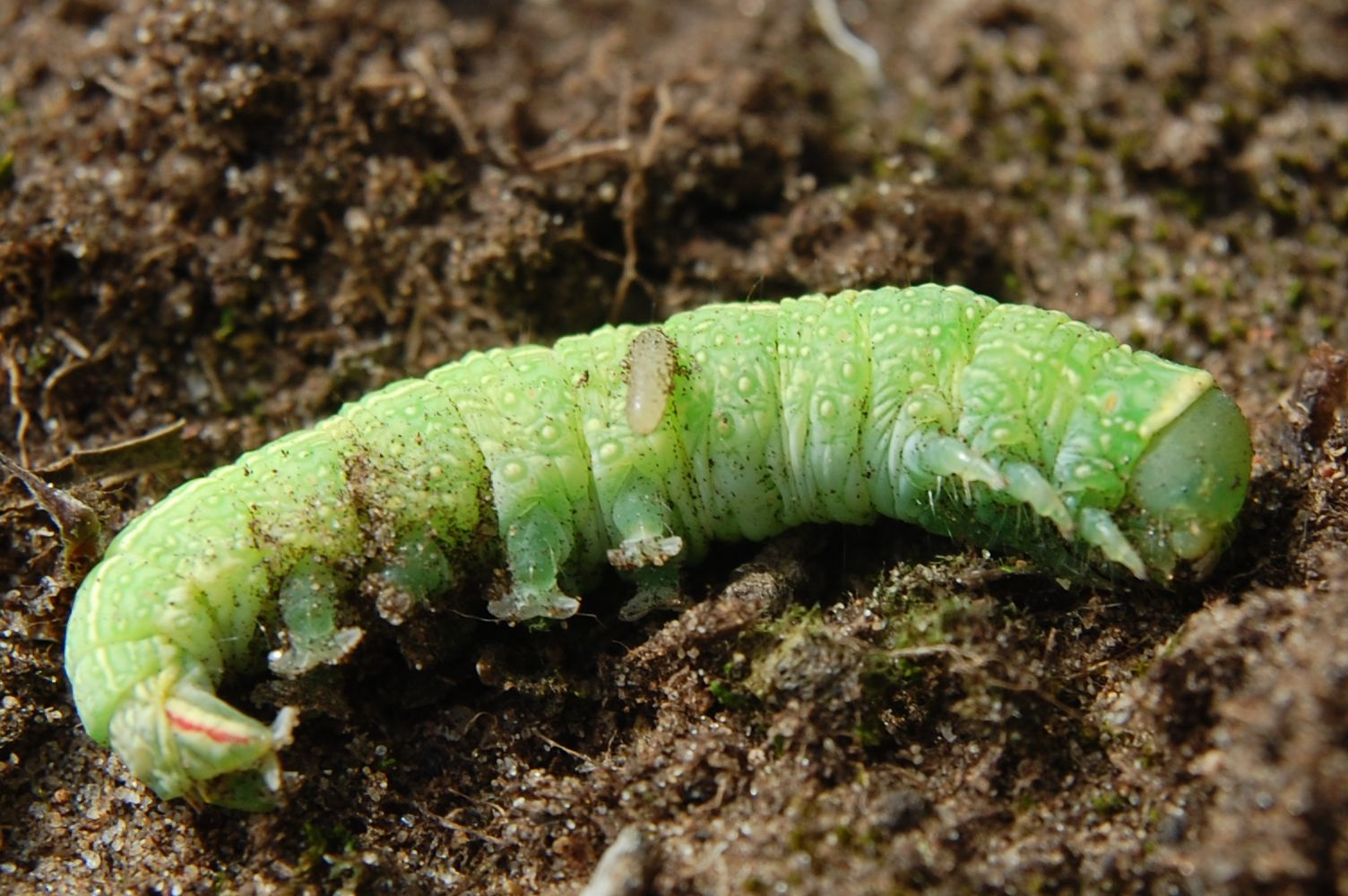
Caterpillar

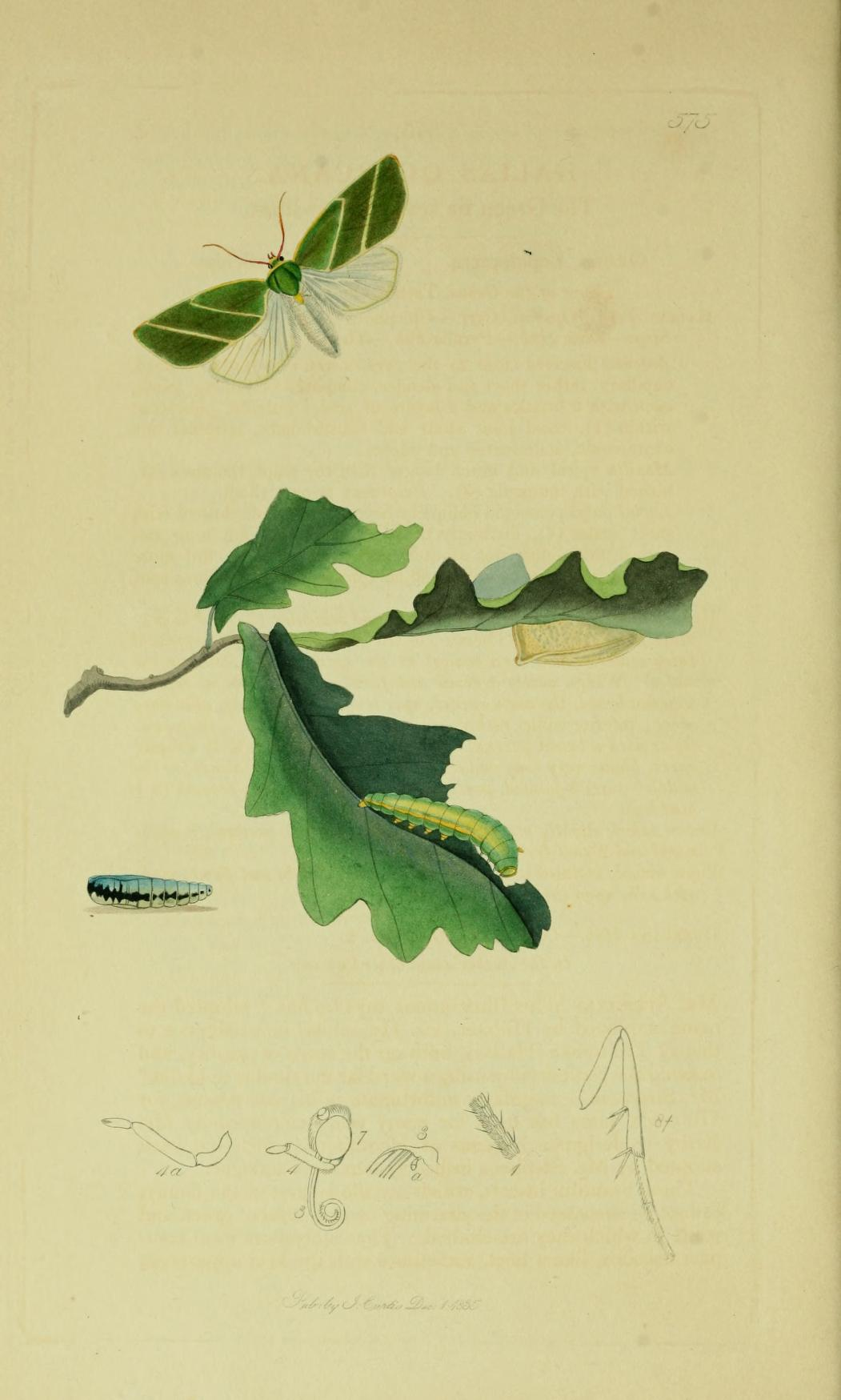
Illustration from John Curtis's British Entomology Volume 6

== Technical description and variation ==
Forewing yellow green; costal edge pink, diffused towards apex; inner marginal area pink-suffused, except towards base; inner and outer lines oblique, darker green, conversely edged with white, the outer sometimes pink; subterminal line white, curved into apex: fringe pink with a white line at base; hindwing yellow; fringe pale pink, white at tips from apex to vein 2: abdomen white, dorsally suffused with yellow; in the female the abdomen is white, tinged with brown at base: forewing with costal edge white, and inner margin yellow; hindwing white. In the British form, subspecies P. p. britannica subsp. nov. (53 k), all the three lines are silvery white; the costal and inner margins in the male reddish only at apex and tornus respectively; in the ab. P. p. rufilinea ab. nov. (= ab. 2 Hmps.) (53 k) the outer line is marked with red. Larva apple green coarsely shagreened with yellow; the subdorsal line yellow; segment 2 red rimmed in front.

== Similar species ==
- Bena bicolorana

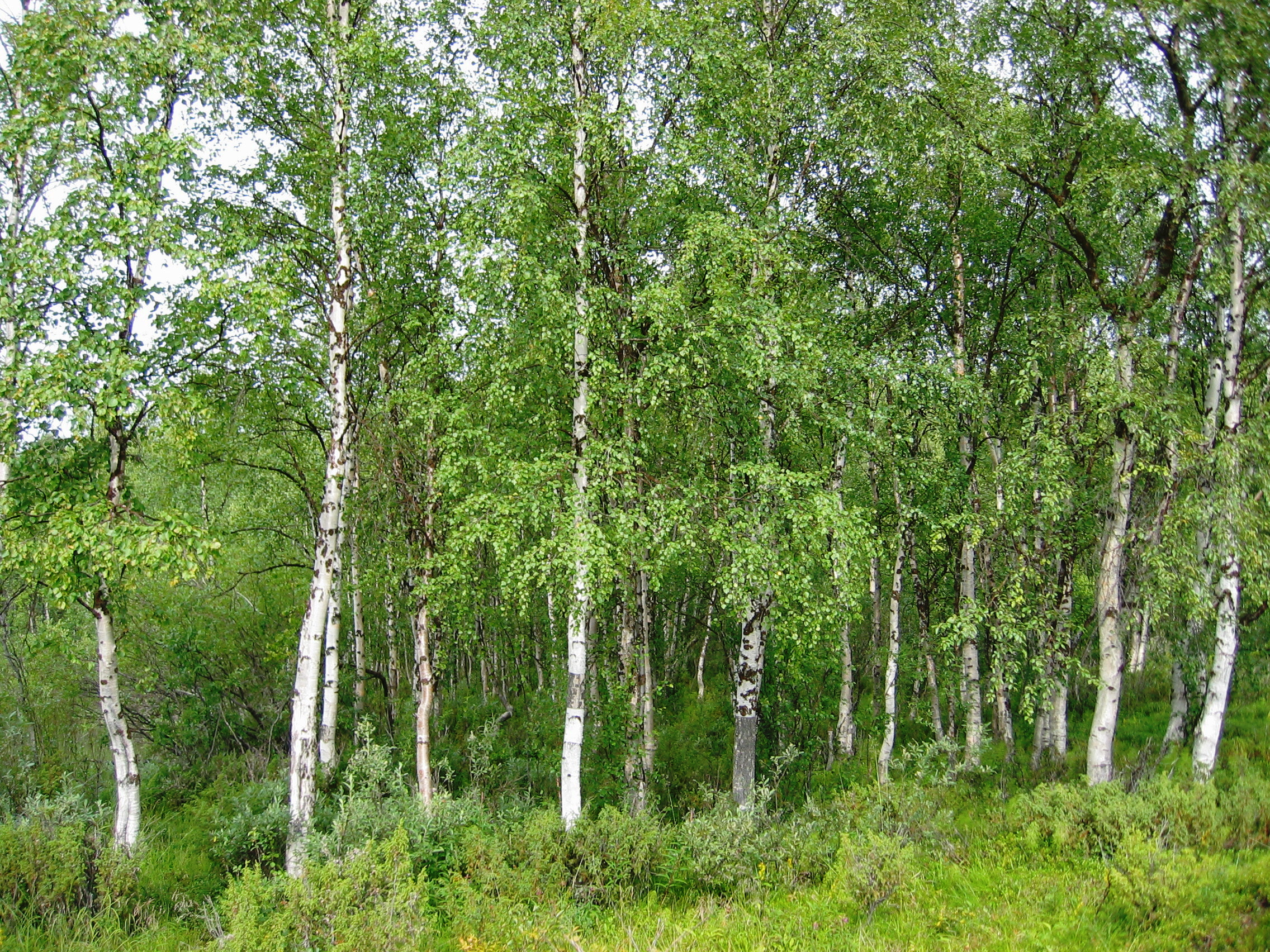
Birch forest habitat in Finland

== Biology ==
The moth flies from June to July depending on the location stridulating on the wing. In August the larvae feed on oak, birch and several other deciduous trees.
