= Alepidiella =

Scientific classification
- Kingdom: Animalia
- Phylum: Arthropoda
- Clade: Pancrustacea
- Class: Insecta
- Order: Hemiptera
- Suborder: Heteroptera
- Family: Miridae
- Tribe: Pilophorini
- Genus: Alepidiella; Poppius, 1914
- Species: A. heidemanni

Binomial name
- Alepidiella heidemanni Poppius, 1914

Genus of true bugs

Alepidiella is a genus of plant bugs in the family Miridae. There is one described species in Alepidiella, A. heidemanni.
