= Pilophorus discretus =

Scientific classification
- Kingdom: Animalia
- Phylum: Arthropoda
- Class: Insecta
- Order: Hemiptera
- Suborder: Heteroptera
- Family: Miridae
- Genus: Pilophorus
- Species: P. discretus

Binomial name
- Pilophorus discretus Van Duzee, 1918

Synonyms
- Pilophorus nicholi Knight, 1973; Pilophorus utahensis Knight, 1968

Species of true bug

Pilophorus discretus is a species of plant bug in the family Miridae. It is found in Central America and North America.
