= Scrobipalpopsis interposita =

Scientific classification
- Kingdom: Animalia
- Phylum: Arthropoda
- Clade: Pancrustacea
- Class: Insecta
- Order: Lepidoptera
- Family: Gelechiidae
- Genus: Scrobipalpopsis
- Species: S. interposita

Binomial name
- Scrobipalpopsis interposita Powell & Povolný, 2001

Species of moth

Scrobipalpopsis interposita is a moth in the family Gelechiidae. It was described by Powell and Povolný in 2001. It is found in North America, where it has been recorded from California.

The larvae feed on Artemisia californica.
