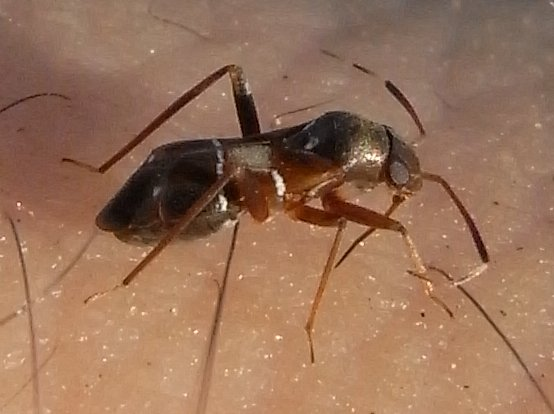
- Pilophorus perplexus

Scientific classification
- Kingdom: Animalia
- Phylum: Arthropoda
- Clade: Pancrustacea
- Class: Insecta
- Order: Hemiptera
- Suborder: Heteroptera
- Family: Miridae
- Genus: Pilophorus
- Species: P. perplexus

Binomial name
- Pilophorus perplexus Douglas & Scott, 1875

= Pilophorus perplexus =

Species of true bug

Pilophorus perplexus is a species of bug in the Miridae family. It can be found almost everywhere in Europe, (except for the Azores, Canary Islands, Cyprus, Iceland, Ireland, and Novaya Zemlya).

== Description ==
The adult of the species is brown in colour. It is 4.5 millimetres (0.18 in) long, and has silver-coloured bands on the forewings, which are hairy as well. In contrast to Pilophorus cinnamopterus, the forewings in this species are much duller. The species feed on aphids.
