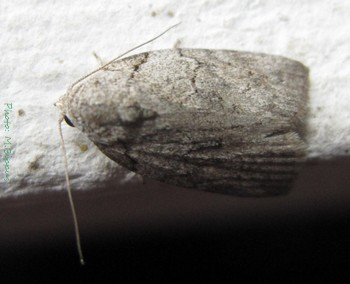

Scientific classification
- Kingdom: Animalia
- Phylum: Arthropoda
- Clade: Pancrustacea
- Class: Insecta
- Order: Lepidoptera
- Superfamily: Noctuoidea
- Family: Nolidae
- Genus: Pardasena
- Species: P. virgulana

Binomial name
- Pardasena virgulana (Mabille, 1880)

Synonyms
- Sarrothripa virgulana Mabille, 1880; Giaura nigriscripta Hampson, 1905

= Pardasena virgulana =

Grey square

Species of moth

Pardasena virgulana, the grey square, is a species of moth in the family Nolidae.

The larva feeds on okra and Leguminosae and in some areas it is considered a pest.
