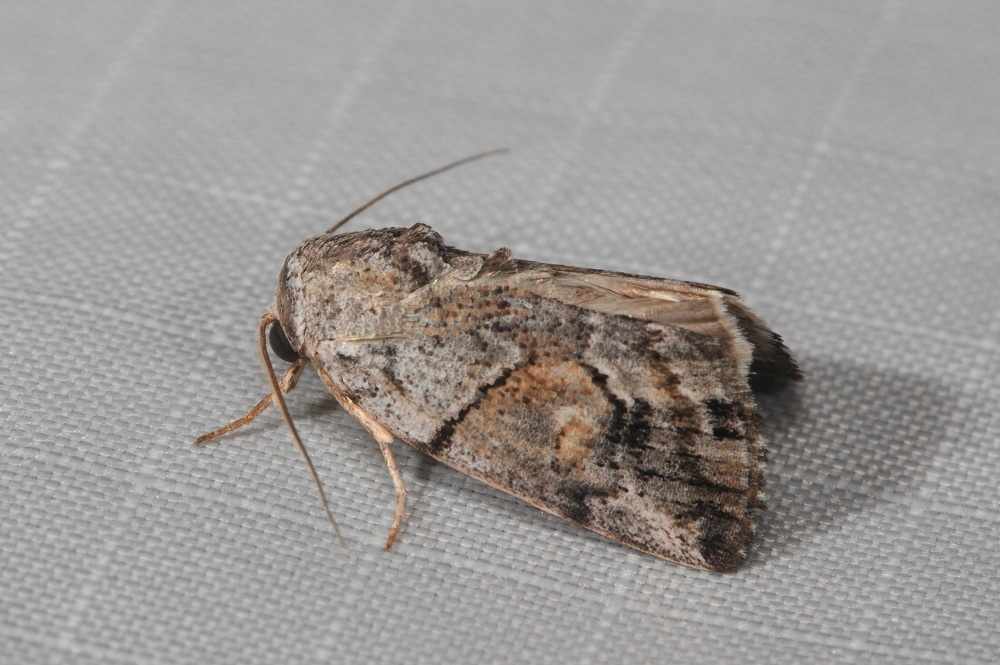
- Bryophilopsis leucopolia

Scientific classification
- Kingdom: Animalia
- Phylum: Arthropoda
- Class: Insecta
- Order: Lepidoptera
- Superfamily: Noctuoidea
- Family: Nolidae
- Tribe: Sarrothripini
- Genus: Bryophilopsis; Hampson, 1894

Type species
- Bryophilopsis griseata Hampson, 1894

Species
- See text

Synonyms
- Hypolispa Turner

= Bryophilopsis =

Genus of moths

Bryophilopsis is a genus of moths of the family Nolidae. The genus was described by George Hampson in 1894.

== Species ==
- Bryophilopsis albiangulata (Mell, 1943)
- Bryophilopsis anomoiota (Bethune-Baker, 1911)
- Bryophilopsis cometes Hampson, 1912
- Bryophilopsis curvifera Hampson, 1912
- Bryophilopsis griseata Hampson, 1894 (from India)
- Bryophilopsis griseoplaga Legrand, 1966
- Bryophilopsis hamula (Snellen, 1872)
- Bryophilopsis leucopolia (Turner, 1926) (from Australia)
- Bryophilopsis lunifera Hampson, 1912
- Bryophilopsis martinae Laporte, 1991
- Bryophilopsis nesta T. B. Fletcher, 1910 (from the Seychelles)
- Bryophilopsis orientalis Hampson, 1912
- Bryophilopsis pullula (Saalmüller, 1880) (from Madagascar)
- Bryophilopsis roederi (Standfuss, 1892) (Near East)
- Bryophilopsis simplex Berio, 1957
- Bryophilopsis tarachoides Mabille, 1900
- Bryophilopsis vadoni Viette, 1982 (from Madagascar)
- Bryophilopsis xephiris Viette, 1976 (from Madagascar)
