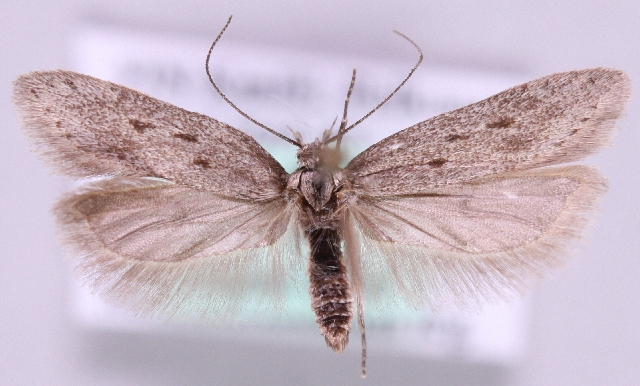

Scientific classification
- Kingdom: Animalia
- Phylum: Arthropoda
- Clade: Pancrustacea
- Class: Insecta
- Order: Lepidoptera
- Family: Gelechiidae
- Genus: Scrobipalpopsis
- Species: S. petasitis

Binomial name
- Scrobipalpopsis petasitis (Pfaffenzeller, 1867)

Synonyms
- Gelechia petasitis Pfaffenzeller, 1867; Gelechia petasitae Heinemann, 1870; Gelechia petasitella Staudinger, 1867

= Scrobipalpopsis petasitis =

Species of moth

Scrobipalpopsis petasitis is a moth in the family Gelechiidae. It was described by Franz Pfaffenzeller in 1867. It is found in northern Europe, the Alps and on the Taimyr Peninsula.

The wingspan is 15–20 mm.
