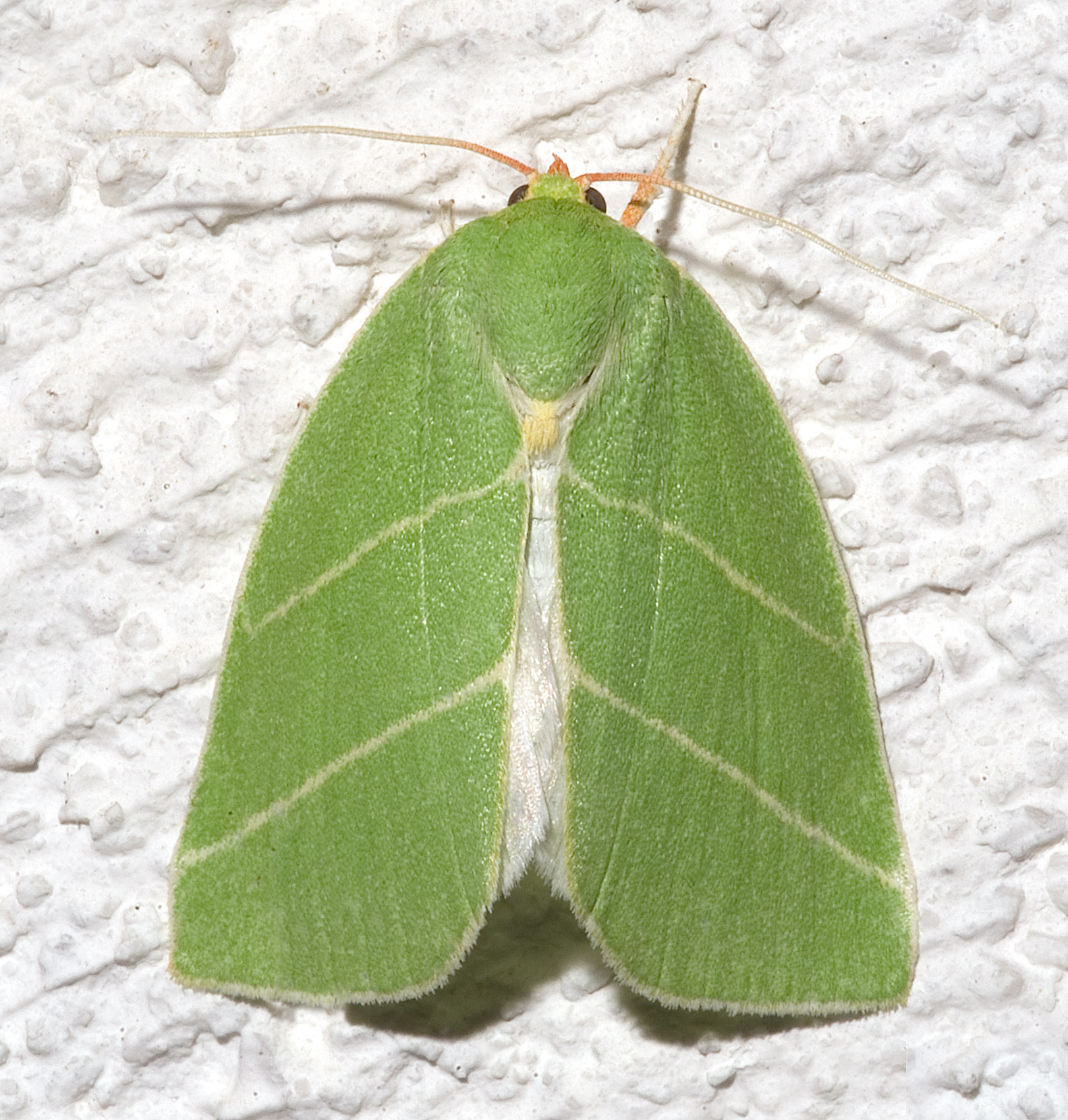

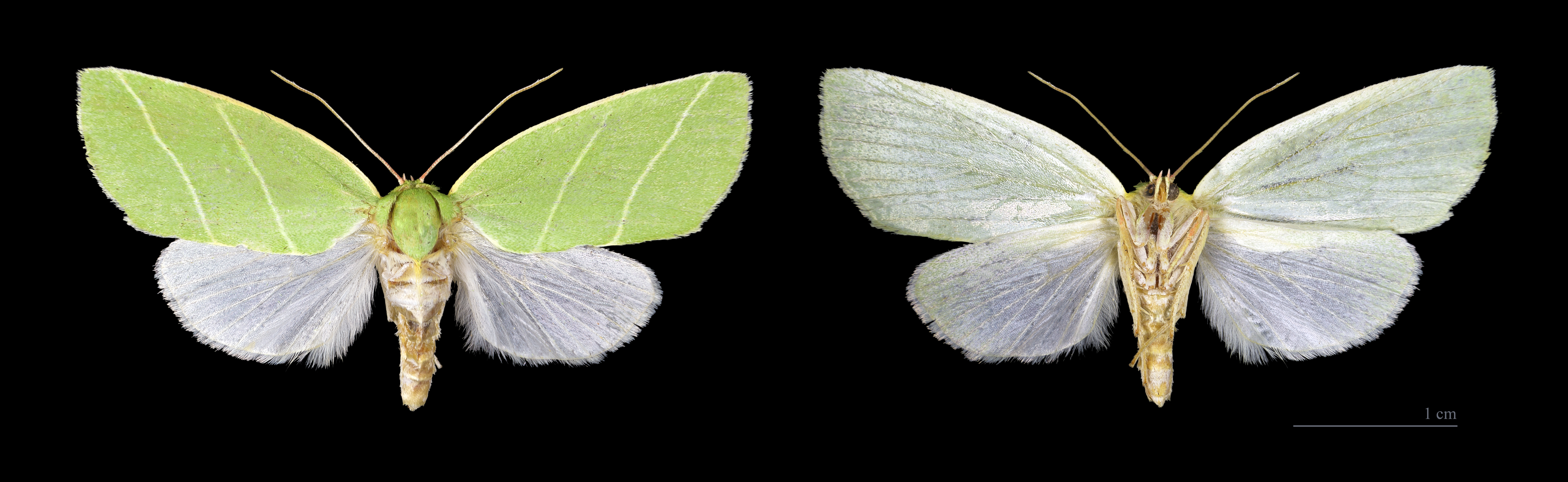
- Both sides - museum specimen

Scientific classification
- Domain: Eukaryota
- Kingdom: Animalia
- Phylum: Arthropoda
- Class: Insecta
- Order: Lepidoptera
- Superfamily: Noctuoidea
- Family: Nolidae
- Genus: Bena
- Species: B. bicolorana

Binomial name
- Bena bicolorana (Fuessly, 1775)

= Bena bicolorana =

Species of moth

Bena bicolorana, the scarce silver-lines, is a moth of the family Nolidae. The species was first described by Johann Kaspar Füssli in 1775. It is found in Europe Turkey, Armenia, Asia Minor and Syria.

== Technical description and variation ==
The forewings are bright apple green; the costal edge yellowish white; inner margin narrowly white; inner and outer lines finely yellowish white, oblique, the outer from costa before apex; hindwing white; fringe white in both wings; in subsp. conspersa subsp. nov. (53 m), from Amasia, the ground colour is blue green, densely covered with pale scales; the costal edge and lines white. Larva green, smooth; the 3rd segment with a yellow tipped dorsal hump; subdorsal and spiracular lines yellow; some pale yellow lateral stripes. The wingspan is 40–50 mm.

== Similar species ==
- Pseudoips prasinana.

== Biology ==
The moth flies in one generation from mid-June to August.

The larvae feed on oak.

== Notes ==
1. The flight season refers to Belgium and the Netherlands. This may vary in other parts of the range.
