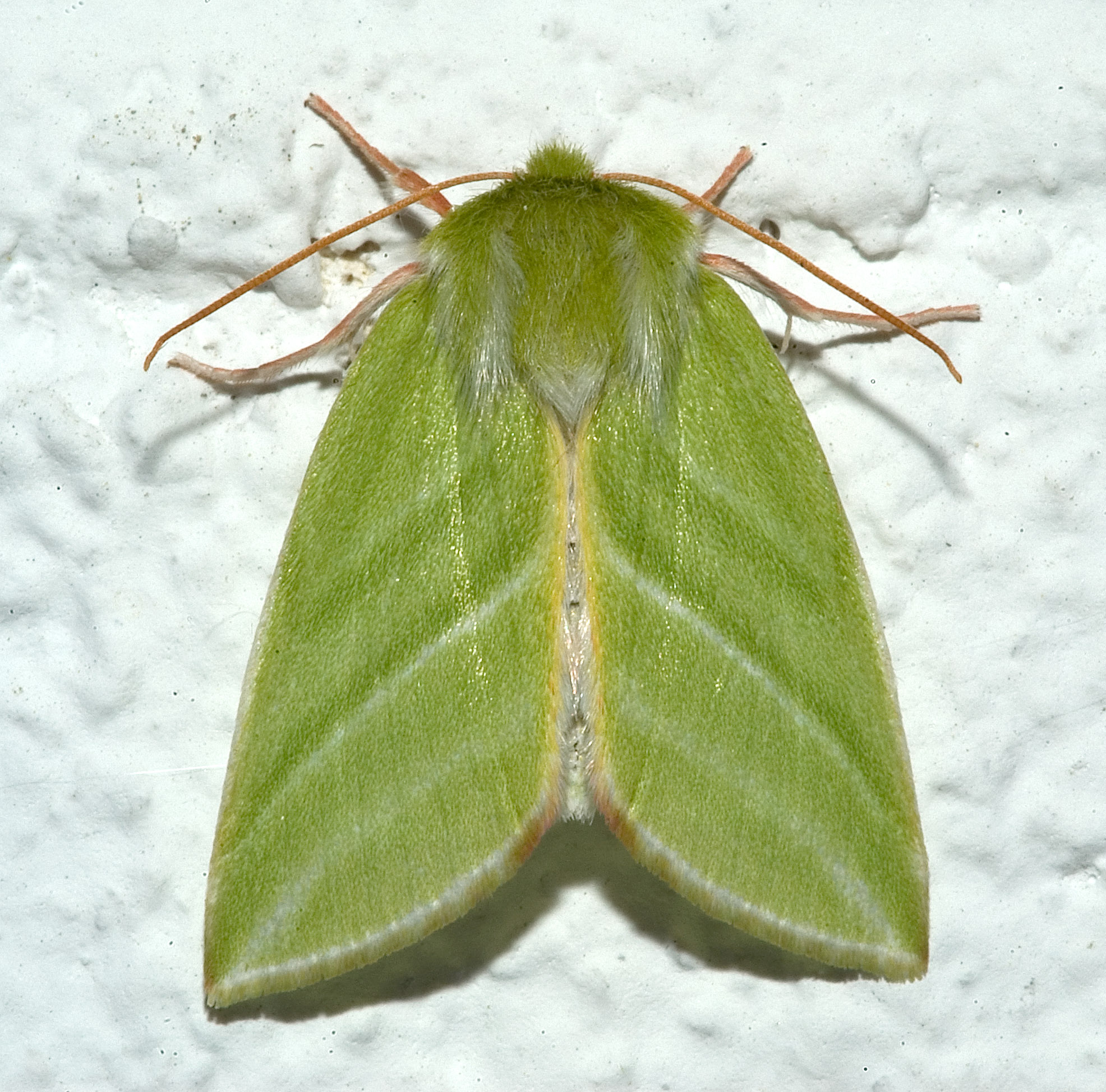
- Pseudoips prasinana, Austria

Scientific classification
- Domain: Eukaryota
- Kingdom: Animalia
- Phylum: Arthropoda
- Class: Insecta
- Order: Lepidoptera
- Superfamily: Noctuoidea
- Family: Nolidae
- Subfamily: Chloephorinae
- Tribe: Chloephorini
- Genus: Pseudoips; Hübner, 1822

Synonyms
- Chloeophora Staudinger, 1887; Chloephora Stephens, 1827; Halias Treitschke, 1829; Hylophila Hübner, 1825

= Pseudoips =

Genus of moths

Pseudoips is a genus of nolid moths in the family Nolidae. There are about six described species in Pseudoips, found mainly in Europe and Eastern Asia.

== Species ==
These six species belong to the genus Pseudoips:

- Pseudoips amarilla Draudt, 1950
- Pseudoips erenkophila Bryk, 1942
- Pseudoips nereida Draudt, 1950
- Pseudoips prasinana (Linnaeus, 1758) (green silver-lines)
- Pseudoips sylpha Butler, 1879
- Pseudoips sylphina Sugi, 1992
