= Sthenarus =

Scientific classification
- Domain: Eukaryota
- Kingdom: Animalia
- Phylum: Arthropoda
- Class: Insecta
- Order: Hemiptera
- Suborder: Heteroptera
- Family: Miridae
- Genus: Sthenarus; Fieber, 1858

Genus of insects

Sthenarus is a genus of true bugs belonging to the family Miridae.

The species of this genus are found in Europe.

== Species ==
Species:

- Sthenarus albipilis Wagner, 1958
- Sthenarus australis Reuter, 1904
- Sthenarus pubescens (Reuter, 1876)
- Sthenarus rotermundi (Scholtz, 1847)
