= Franz Pfaffenzeller =

German entomologist

Franz Pfaffenzeller (? in Munich – 1880) was a German entomologist who specialised in Lepidoptera especially the Microlepidoptera of the Alps. His collections are held by the Natural History Museum, Berlin

Pfaffenzeller wrote

- Franz Pfaffenzeller (1857) Ueber Euprepia flava. Entomologische Zeitung, Stettin - 18 84-90, 1 Taf.
- Franz Pfaffenzeller (1860) Ueber Gastropacha Arbusculae. Entomologische Zeitung Stettin 21: 126 - 129.
- Franz Pfaffenzeller (1867): Gelechia Petasitis, n. sp. Entomologische Zeitung 28 (1-3): 79. Stettin.
- Franz Pfaffenzeller (1870) Neue Tineinen Stettin Ent. Ztg 31 (7-9) : 320-324

New taxa described include Scrobipalpa samadensis (Pfaffenzeller, 1870) and Scrobipalpopsis petasitis (Pfaffenzeller, 1867). His name is honoured in Callisto pfaffenzelleri (Frey, 1856)
