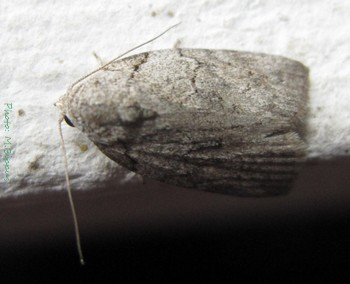

Scientific classification
- Kingdom: Animalia
- Phylum: Arthropoda
- Clade: Pancrustacea
- Class: Insecta
- Order: Lepidoptera
- Superfamily: Noctuoidea
- Family: Nolidae
- Subfamily: Chloephorinae
- Genus: Pardasena; Walker, 1866

= Pardasena =

Genus of moths

Pardasena is a genus of small moths belonging to the family Nolidae described by Francis Walker in 1866.

== Species ==
- Pardasena acronyctella (Walker, 1866)
- Pardasena atmocyma (D. S. Fletcher, 1961)
- Pardasena atripuncta (Hampson, 1912)
- Pardasena beauvallonensis (Legrand, 1965)
- Pardasena brunnescens (Hampson, 1905)
- Pardasena fletcheri (Berio, 1976/77)
- Pardasena lativia (Hampson, 1912)
- Pardasena melanosticta (Hampson, 1912)
- Pardasena minorella (Walker, 1866)
- Pardasena miochroa (Hampson, 1905)
- Pardasena nigriscripta (Hampson, 1905)
- Pardasena nolalana (Berio, 1956/57)
- Pardasena punctata (Hampson, 1902)
- Pardasena punctilinea (Hampson, 1918)
- Pardasena roeselioides (Walker, 1858)
- Pardasena verna (Hampson, 1902)
- Pardasena virgulana (Mabille, 1880)
