= Karl Alfred Poppius =

Finnish entomologist (1846–1920)

Karl Alfred Poppius (1846 Jaakkima, Karelia – 1920 Helsinki) was a Finnish entomologist who worked on Lepidoptera, Coleoptera and Hemiptera.

== Works ==
- Finland's Dendrometridae, 1887
- Finland's Phytometridae, 1891
