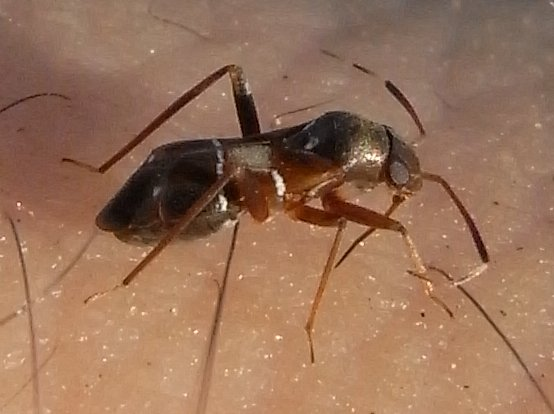
- Pilophorus perplexus

Scientific classification
- Kingdom: Animalia
- Phylum: Arthropoda
- Class: Insecta
- Order: Hemiptera
- Suborder: Heteroptera
- Family: Miridae
- Subfamily: Phylinae
- Tribe: Pilophorini; Douglas & Scott, 1876

= Pilophorini =

Tribe of true bugs

Pilophorini is a tribe of plant bugs. The type genus is Pilophorus (Hahn, 1826). Schuh's analysis indicates that the Pilophorini originated in tropical Gondwanaland and subsequently spread into the temperate Northern Hemisphere, where they differentiated into the known genera.

== Genera ==
Tribe Pilophorini Douglas & Scott, 1876

- Genus Alepidiella Poppius, 1914 - Eastern Nearctic
- Genus Aloea Linnavuori, 1975 - Africa, Middle East
- Genus Dilatops Weirauch, 2006 - Australia, Oceania
- Genus Druthmarus Distant, 1909 - Orient
- Genus Ethatractus Linnavuori, 1975 - Africa
- Genus Hypseloecus Reuter, 1891 - Paleotropics, Australia
- Genus Lasiolabops Poppius, 1914 - Paleotropics
- Genus Neoambonea Schuh, 1974 - Africa
- Genus Parambonea Schuh, 1974 - Africa
- Genus Parasthenaridea Miller, 1937 - Orient
- Genus Pherolepis Kulik, 1968 - Eastern Palearctic
- Genus Pilophorus Hahn, 1826 - Holarctic, Orient
- Genus Pseudambonea Schuh, 1974 - Africa
- Genus Randallophorus Henry, 2013 - Neotropics
- Genus Spinolosus Zou, 1985 - Orient
- Genus Sthenaridea Reuter, 1885 - Circumtropical
