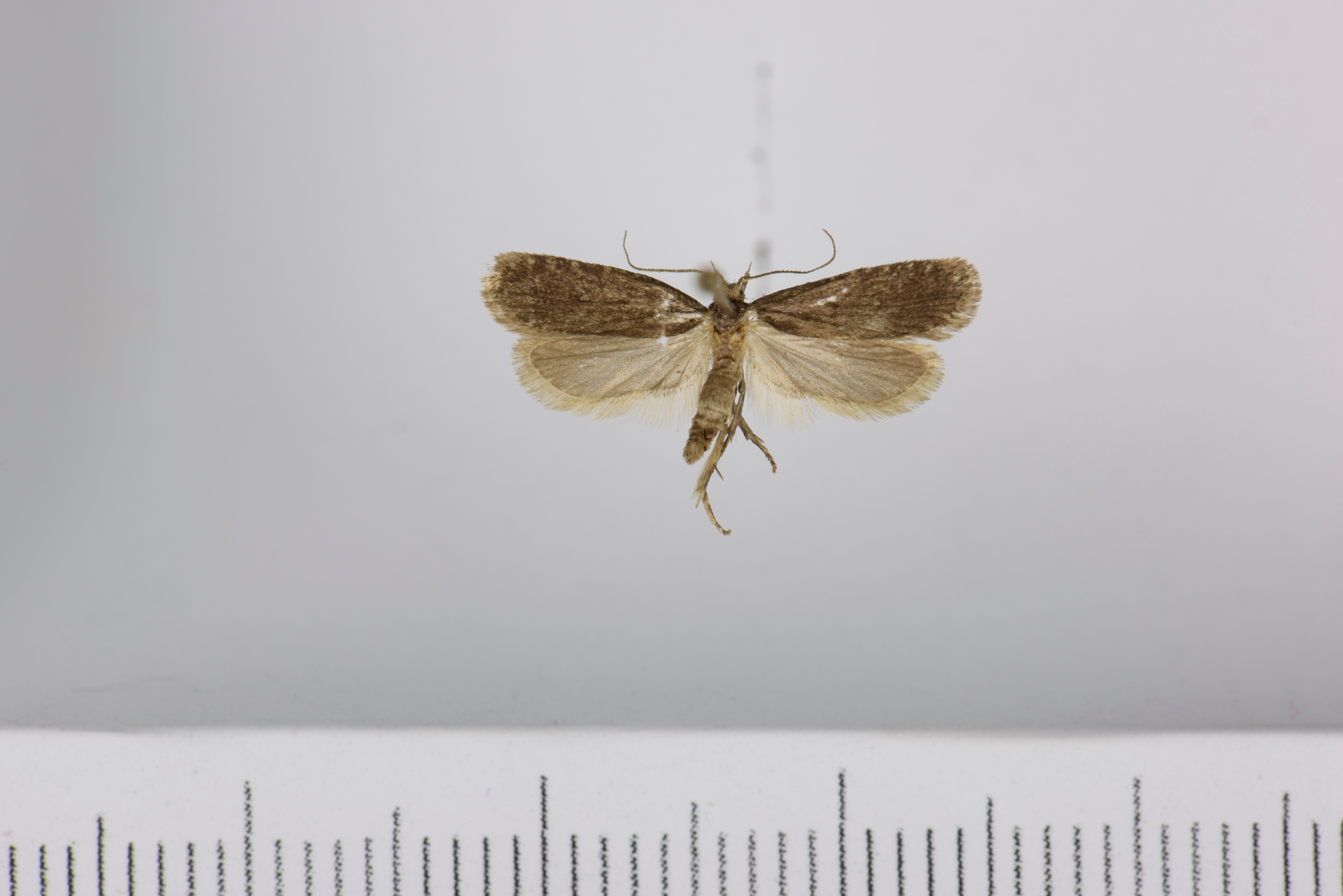

Scientific classification
- Kingdom: Animalia
- Phylum: Arthropoda
- Clade: Pancrustacea
- Class: Insecta
- Order: Lepidoptera
- Family: Depressariidae
- Genus: Agonopterix
- Species: A. arctica

Binomial name
- Agonopterix arctica (Strand, 1902)

Synonyms
- Depressaria arctica Strand, 1902; Depressaria nordlandica Strand, 1920

= Agonopterix arctica =

Species of moth

Agonopterix arctica is a moth of the family Depressariidae. It is found in Fennoscandia and northern Russia.

The wingspan is 15–19 mm. Adults are on wing from July to August.

The larvae feed on Salix myrsinites and Salix myrtilloides.
