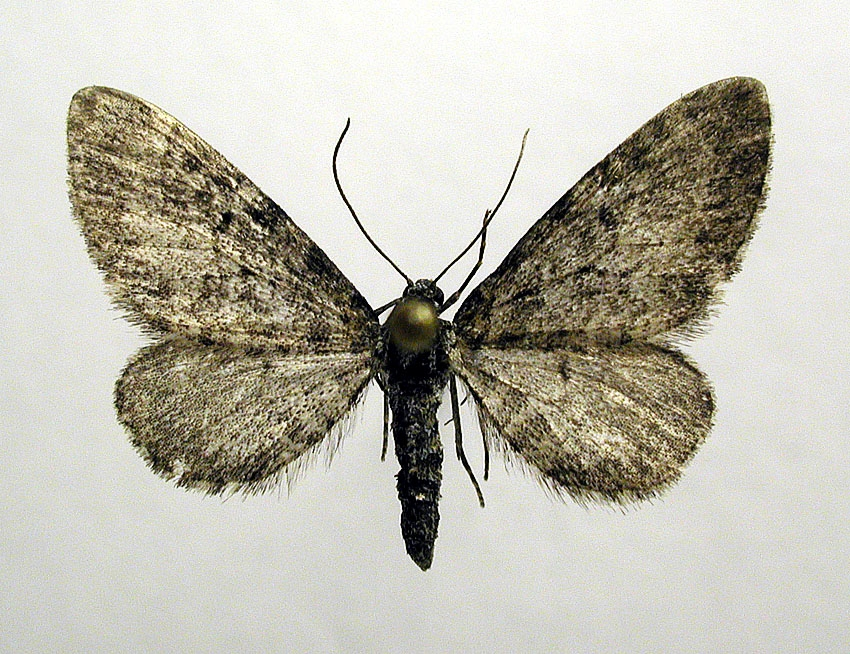

Scientific classification
- Domain: Eukaryota
- Kingdom: Animalia
- Phylum: Arthropoda
- Class: Insecta
- Order: Lepidoptera
- Family: Geometridae
- Genus: Eupithecia
- Species: E. fennoscandica

Binomial name
- Eupithecia fennoscandica Knaben, 1949

= Eupithecia fennoscandica =

Species of moth

Eupithecia fennoscandica is a moth of the family Geometridae. It is known from northern Fennoscandia and adjacent Russia, Siberia and northern Mongolia.

The wingspan is 17–21 mm. There is one generation per year with adults on wing in July.

The larvae feed on Viscaria alpina. Larvae can be found from mid July to mid August. It overwinters as a pupa.
