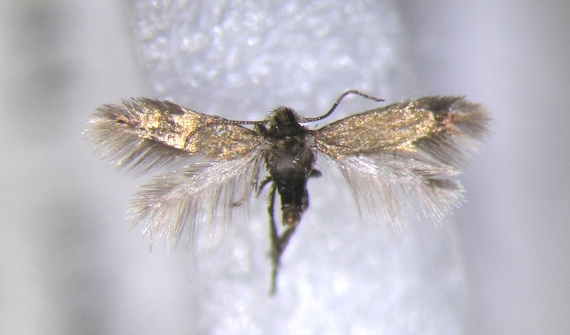

Scientific classification
- Kingdom: Animalia
- Phylum: Arthropoda
- Clade: Pancrustacea
- Class: Insecta
- Order: Lepidoptera
- Family: Nepticulidae
- Genus: Stigmella
- Species: S. tristis

Binomial name
- Stigmella tristis (Wocke, 1862)

Synonyms
- Nepticula tristis Wocke, 1862

= Stigmella tristis =

Species of moth

Stigmella tristis is a moth of the family Nepticulidae. It is endemic to Fennoscandia.

The wingspan is 4–5 mm.

The larvae feed on Betula nana. They mine the leaves of their host plant.
