= Phyllonorycter rolandi =

Scientific classification
- Domain: Eukaryota
- Kingdom: Animalia
- Phylum: Arthropoda
- Class: Insecta
- Order: Lepidoptera
- Family: Gracillariidae
- Genus: Phyllonorycter
- Species: P. rolandi

Binomial name
- Phyllonorycter rolandi (Svensson, 1966)

Synonyms
- Lithocolletis rolandi Svensson, 1966

Species of moth

Phyllonorycter rolandi is a moth of the family Gracillariidae. It is known from Fennoscandia and the European part of Russia.

The larvae feed on Salix lapponum.
