= Coleophora unigenella =

Scientific classification
- Kingdom: Animalia
- Phylum: Arthropoda
- Class: Insecta
- Order: Lepidoptera
- Family: Coleophoridae
- Genus: Coleophora
- Species: C. unigenella

Binomial name
- Coleophora unigenella Svensson, 1966

Species of moth

Coleophora unigenella is a moth of the family Coleophoridae. It is found in Fennoscandia, northern Russia and the Alps.

The larvae feed on Dryas octopetala. Larvae can be found from autumn to spring.
