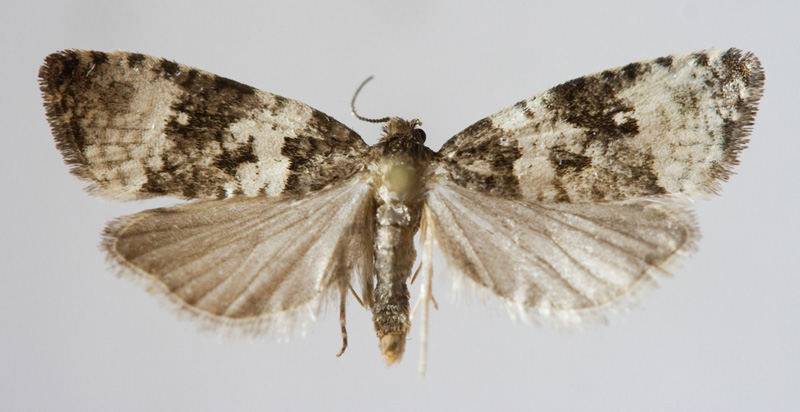

Scientific classification
- Kingdom: Animalia
- Phylum: Arthropoda
- Class: Insecta
- Order: Lepidoptera
- Family: Tortricidae
- Genus: Phiaris
- Species: P. heinrichana

Binomial name
- Phiaris heinrichana (McDunnough, 1927)

= Phiaris heinrichana =

Species of moth

Phiaris heinrichana is a species of moth belonging to the family Tortricidae.

It is native to Europe and Northern America.
