= Phyllonorycter hostis =

Scientific classification
- Kingdom: Animalia
- Phylum: Arthropoda
- Clade: Pancrustacea
- Class: Insecta
- Order: Lepidoptera
- Family: Gracillariidae
- Genus: Phyllonorycter
- Species: P. hostis

Binomial name
- Phyllonorycter hostis Triberti, 2007

Species of moth

Phyllonorycter hostis is a moth of the family Gracillariidae. It is known from Italy, Serbia, North Macedonia, Montenegro and Tunisia. There are some records from Great Britain and Germany.

There are four generations per year in Italy.

The larvae feed on Cydonia, Malus domestica, Prunus avium, Prunus persica, Pyrus communis and Sorbus torminalis. They mine the leaves of their host plant.
