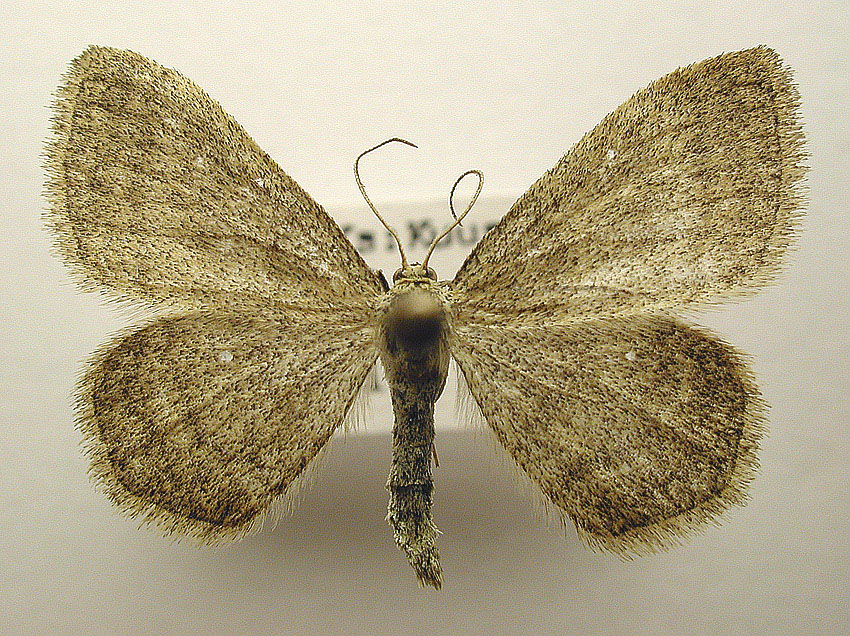

Scientific classification
- Domain: Eukaryota
- Kingdom: Animalia
- Phylum: Arthropoda
- Class: Insecta
- Order: Lepidoptera
- Family: Geometridae
- Genus: Scopula
- Species: S. frigidaria

Binomial name
- Scopula frigidaria (Möschler, 1869)

Synonyms
- Acidalia frigidaria Moschler, 1860; Acidalia schoeyeni Sparre-Schneider, 1883; Acidalia arcticaria Walker, 1863; Acidalia defixaria Walker, 1861; Acidalia impauperata Walker, 1861; Acidalia okakaria Packard, 1867

= Scopula frigidaria =

Species of geometer moth in subfamily Sterrhinae

Scopula frigidaria is a moth of the family Geometridae. It was described by Heinrich Benno Möschler in 1869. It is found from Fennoscandia to the Kamchatka Peninsula and in northern North America, where it occurs across the boreal forest region, from Alaska across the Northwest Territories and Nunavut to Newfoundland, and in the mountains south to southern Wisconsin, Alberta and British Columbia.

The wingspan is 21–23 millimetres (0.83–0.91 in). Adults are on wing from late May to June in one generation per year.

The larvae feed on Vaccinium myrtillus. Larvae can be found from July to May. It overwinters in the larval stage.

== Subspecies ==
- Scopula frigidaria frigidaria
- Scopula frigidaria schoyeni (Schneider, 1883) (Kola Peninsula, Fennoscandia)
