= Elachista tanaella =

Scientific classification
- Kingdom: Animalia
- Phylum: Arthropoda
- Class: Insecta
- Order: Lepidoptera
- Family: Elachistidae
- Genus: Elachista
- Species: E. tanaella

Binomial name
- Elachista tanaella Aarvik & Berggren, 2003

Species of moth

Elachista tanaella is a moth of the family Elachistidae, the grass-miner moths. It is only known from northern Norway.

== Taxonomy ==
Elachista tanaella was first formally described in 2003 by Leif Aarvik and Karl Berggren with its type locality given as Norway. This species has been placed in the bifasciella subgroup of the Elaschia bifasciella species complex but the anatomy of the male antennae, with their short visible cilia, is unique within this complex setting this taxon apart from other taxa within that complex. The grass miner moths in the family Elastichidae are classified within the superfamily Gelechioidea of the clade Ditrysia, the lepidopteran clade which includes all of the butterflies and the majority of moth species.

== Description ==
Elachista tanaella has a wingspan of 8.5–11.5 millimetres (0.33–0.45 in). The head is brownish grey, with paler, nearly white, posterior scales on the neck tufts with the scales on the labial palpus and antennae being grey and some lighter scales on the scape, i.e. the basal segment of the antenna. The thorax is brownish grey with some paler scales with darker tips. The tegulae have pale scale to the posterior, some of these have darker tips. The abdomen is brownish grey with a yellowish-grey anal tuft in males and a more ochre-coloured anal tuft in females. The forewing is plain brownish-grey and the hindwing is grey.

== Habitat ==
Elachista tanaella is found immediately above the tree line in wet bogs dominated by Carex rotundata. with some Eriophorum angustifolium also growing alongise the C. rotundata and Salix glauca forming patches within the bogs and around them.

== Biology ==
Elachista tanaella adults have been recorded in July. The larvae feed on Carex rotundata. They mine the leaves of their host plant.
