= Anarta colletti =

Scientific classification
- Domain: Eukaryota
- Kingdom: Animalia
- Phylum: Arthropoda
- Class: Insecta
- Order: Lepidoptera
- Superfamily: Noctuoidea
- Family: Noctuidae
- Genus: Anarta
- Species: A. colletti

Binomial name
- Anarta colletti (Sparre-Schneider, 1876)

Species of moth

Anarta colletti is a species of moth belonging to the family Noctuidae.

It is native to Norway.
