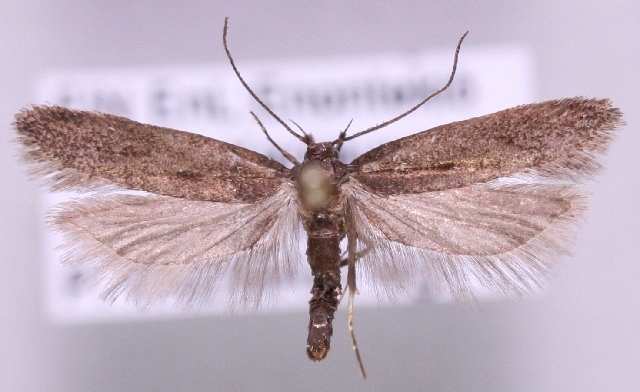

Scientific classification
- Kingdom: Animalia
- Phylum: Arthropoda
- Clade: Pancrustacea
- Class: Insecta
- Order: Lepidoptera
- Family: Gelechiidae
- Genus: Chionodes
- Species: C. violacea

Binomial name
- Chionodes violacea (Tengström, 1848)

Synonyms
- Gelechia violacea Tengström, 1848; Chionodes violaceus

= Chionodes violacea =

Species of moth

Chionodes violacea is a moth of the family Gelechiidae. It is found from Scandinavia to Russia (Siberia, Uljanovsk, Kamchatka) and Mongolia.

The wingspan is 15–17 mm. Adults have been recorded on wing from June to July.
