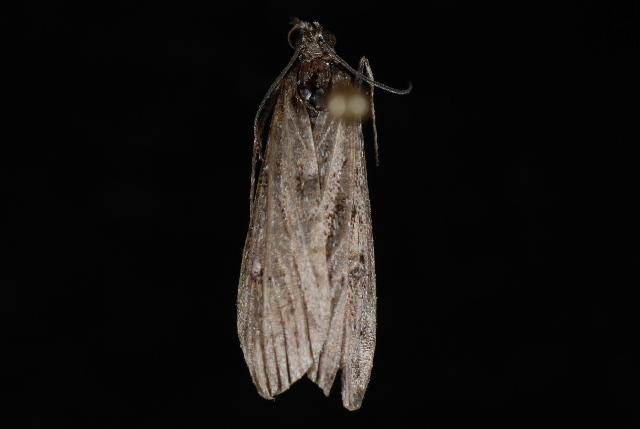

Scientific classification
- Kingdom: Animalia
- Phylum: Arthropoda
- Class: Insecta
- Order: Lepidoptera
- Family: Crambidae
- Genus: Eudonia
- Species: E. alpina

Binomial name
- Eudonia alpina (Curtis, 1850)

Synonyms
- Eudorea alpina Curtis, 1850; Eudorea borealis Tengström, 1848; Eudonia japanalpina Inoue, 1982; Eudonia lugubralis madgei Munroe, 1972; Eudorea gracilalis Stainton, 1855; Eudoria persimilalis McDunnough, 1961; Scoparia alpina var. lapponica Caradja, 1916; Scoparia lugubralis Walker, 1866; Eudonia lugubralis; Scoparia phycitinalis Dyar, 1929

= Eudonia alpina =

Species of moth

Eudonia alpina is a species of moth in the family Crambidae. It is found in Great Britain, Fennoscandia, Estonia, Russia, Japan and North America, including Alaska, Alberta, Newfoundland, Minnesota, Ohio and West Virginia.

The wingspan is 20–25 mm. Adults are on wing in June and July in Europe.

The larvae probably feed on mosses or lichens.
