= Apamea schildei =

Scientific classification
- Domain: Eukaryota
- Kingdom: Animalia
- Phylum: Arthropoda
- Class: Insecta
- Order: Lepidoptera
- Superfamily: Noctuoidea
- Family: Noctuidae
- Genus: Apamea
- Species: A. schildei

Binomial name
- Apamea schildei (Staudinger, 1901)

Species of moth

Apamea schildei is a species of moth belonging to the family Noctuidae.

It is native to Northern Europe.
