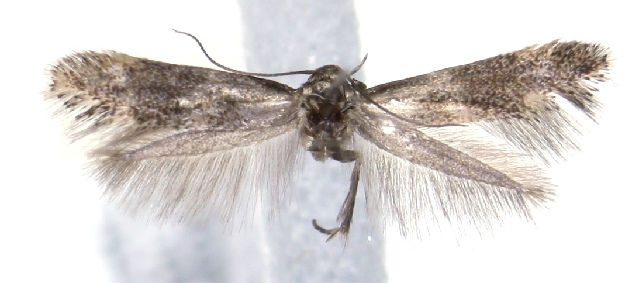

Scientific classification
- Domain: Eukaryota
- Kingdom: Animalia
- Phylum: Arthropoda
- Class: Insecta
- Order: Lepidoptera
- Family: Elachistidae
- Genus: Elachista
- Species: E. krogeri

Binomial name
- Elachista krogeri Svensson, 1976

= Elachista krogeri =

Species of moth

Elachista krogeri is a moth of the family Elachistidae. It is found in Fennoscandia and northern Russia.

The wingspan is 8–10 millimetres (0.31–0.39 in). Adults are on wing from June to August.
