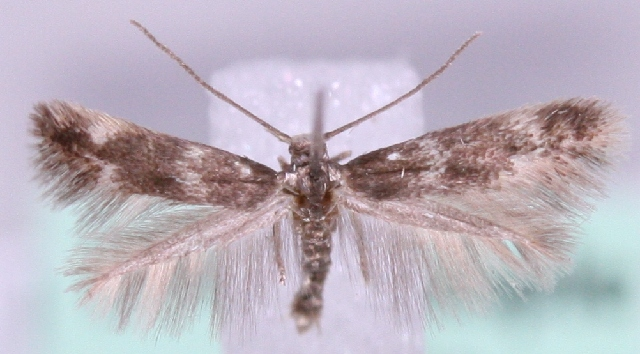

Scientific classification
- Domain: Eukaryota
- Kingdom: Animalia
- Phylum: Arthropoda
- Class: Insecta
- Order: Lepidoptera
- Family: Elachistidae
- Genus: Elachista
- Species: E. nielswolffi

Binomial name
- Elachista nielswolffi Svensson, 1976

= Elachista nielswolffi =

Species of moth

Elachista nielswolffi is a moth of the family Elachistidae. It is found in Fennoscandia and northern Russia. The wingspan is 7–9 millimetres (0.28–0.35 in).

The larvae feed on Deschampsia flexuosa and possibly on Nardus stricta. They mine the leaves of their host plant. They are pale dull dirty white.
