= Scrobipalpa reiprichi =

Scientific classification
- Kingdom: Animalia
- Phylum: Arthropoda
- Clade: Pancrustacea
- Class: Insecta
- Order: Lepidoptera
- Family: Gelechiidae
- Genus: Scrobipalpa
- Species: S. reiprichi

Binomial name
- Scrobipalpa reiprichi Povolný, 1984

Synonyms
- Scrobipalpa (Euscrobipalpa) reiprichi Povolný, 1984

Species of moth

Scrobipalpa reiprichi is a moth in the family Gelechiidae. It was described by Povolný in 1984. It is found in Norway, Hungary, Slovakia, China (Shaanxi) and Russia (Sakhalin).

The length of the forewings is about 5.5 mm (0.22 in).
