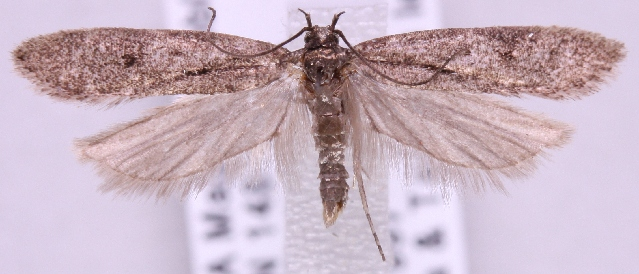

Scientific classification
- Kingdom: Animalia
- Phylum: Arthropoda
- Clade: Pancrustacea
- Class: Insecta
- Order: Lepidoptera
- Family: Gelechiidae
- Genus: Chionodes
- Species: C. nubilella

Binomial name
- Chionodes nubilella (Zetterstedt, 1839)

Synonyms
- Haemylis nubilella Zetterstedt, 1839; Gelechia tarandella Wocke, 1864

= Chionodes nubilella =

Species of moth

Chionodes nubilella is a moth of the family Gelechiidae. It is found in Scandinavia and northern Russia.

The wingspan is 16–19 mm. Adults have been recorded on wing from June to August.
