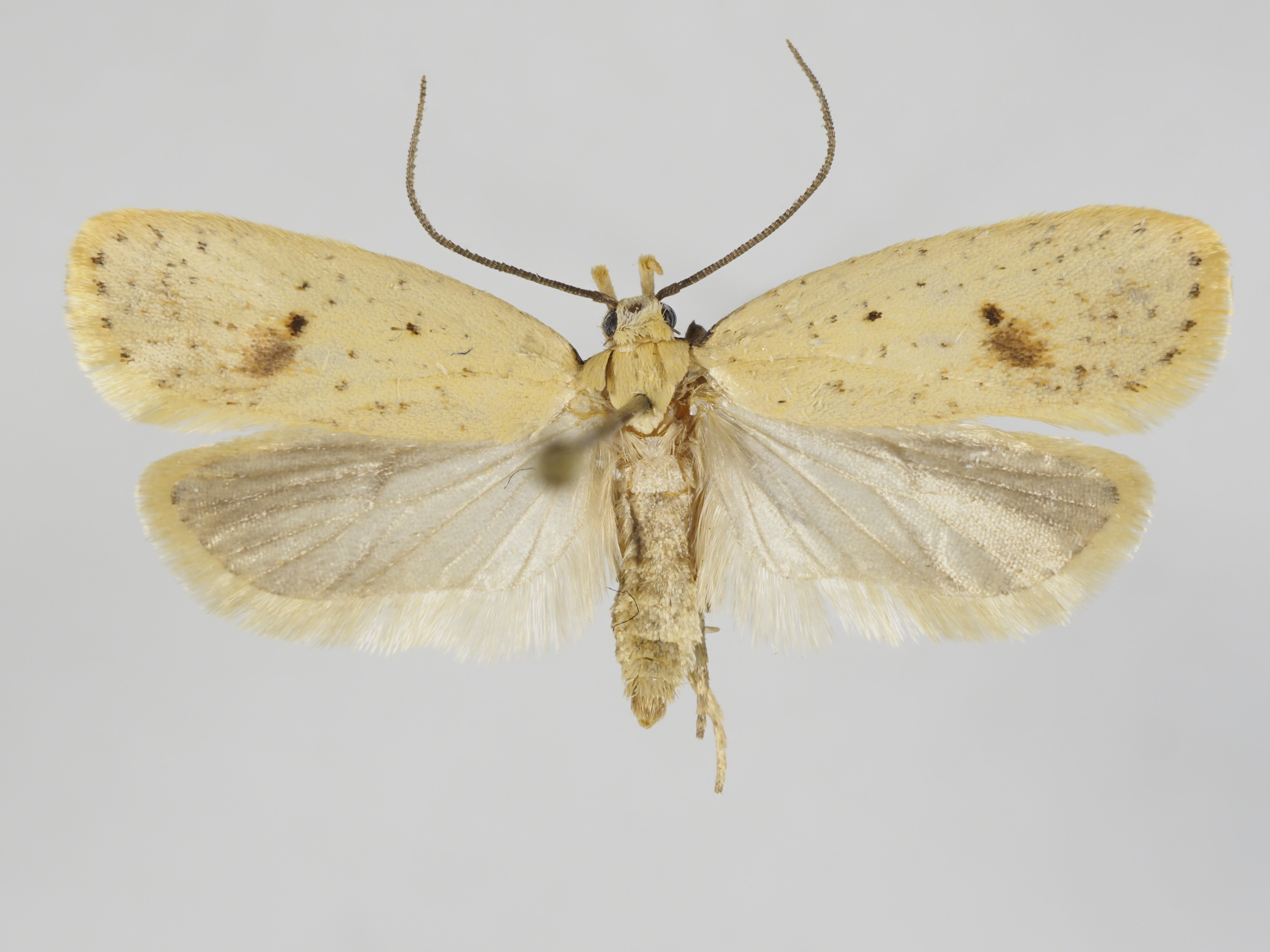

Scientific classification
- Kingdom: Animalia
- Phylum: Arthropoda
- Clade: Pancrustacea
- Class: Insecta
- Order: Lepidoptera
- Family: Depressariidae
- Genus: Agonopterix
- Species: A. broennoeensis

Binomial name
- Agonopterix broennoeensis (Strand, 1920)

Synonyms
- Depressaria flavella var. broennoeensis Strand, 1920; Agonopterix roseoflavella Benander, 1955

= Agonopterix broennoeensis =

Species of moth

Agonopterix broennoeensis is a moth of the family Depressariidae. It is found in Fennoscandia and northern Russia.

The wingspan is 19–22 mm. Adults are on wing in August.

The larvae feed on Saussurea alpina.
