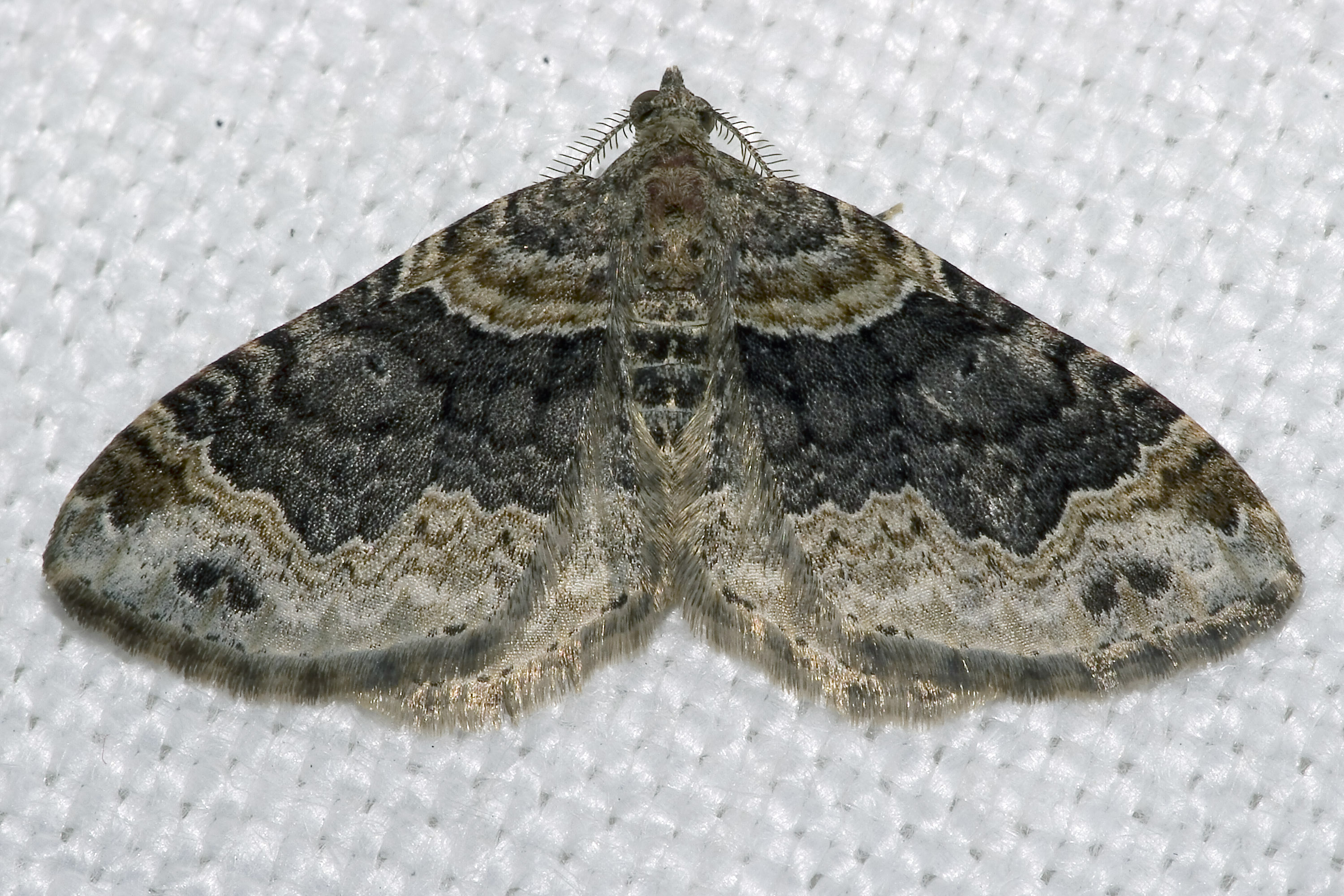

Scientific classification
- Kingdom: Animalia
- Phylum: Arthropoda
- Class: Insecta
- Order: Lepidoptera
- Family: Geometridae
- Genus: Xanthorhoe
- Species: X. ferrugata

Binomial name
- Xanthorhoe ferrugata (Clerck, 1759)

= Xanthorhoe ferrugata =

Dark-barred twin-spot carpet

Species of moth

Xanthorhoe ferrugata, the dark-barred twin-spot carpet, is a moth of the genus Xanthorhoe in the family Geometridae. It was first described by Carl Alexander Clerck in 1759 and has a Holarctic distribution.

== Distribution ==
It is found in Europe and east to the Russian Far East, Siberia, Tibet and China, south to the Caucasus and Turkey. Also in North America (Alaska to Newfoundland and south to North Carolina and California).

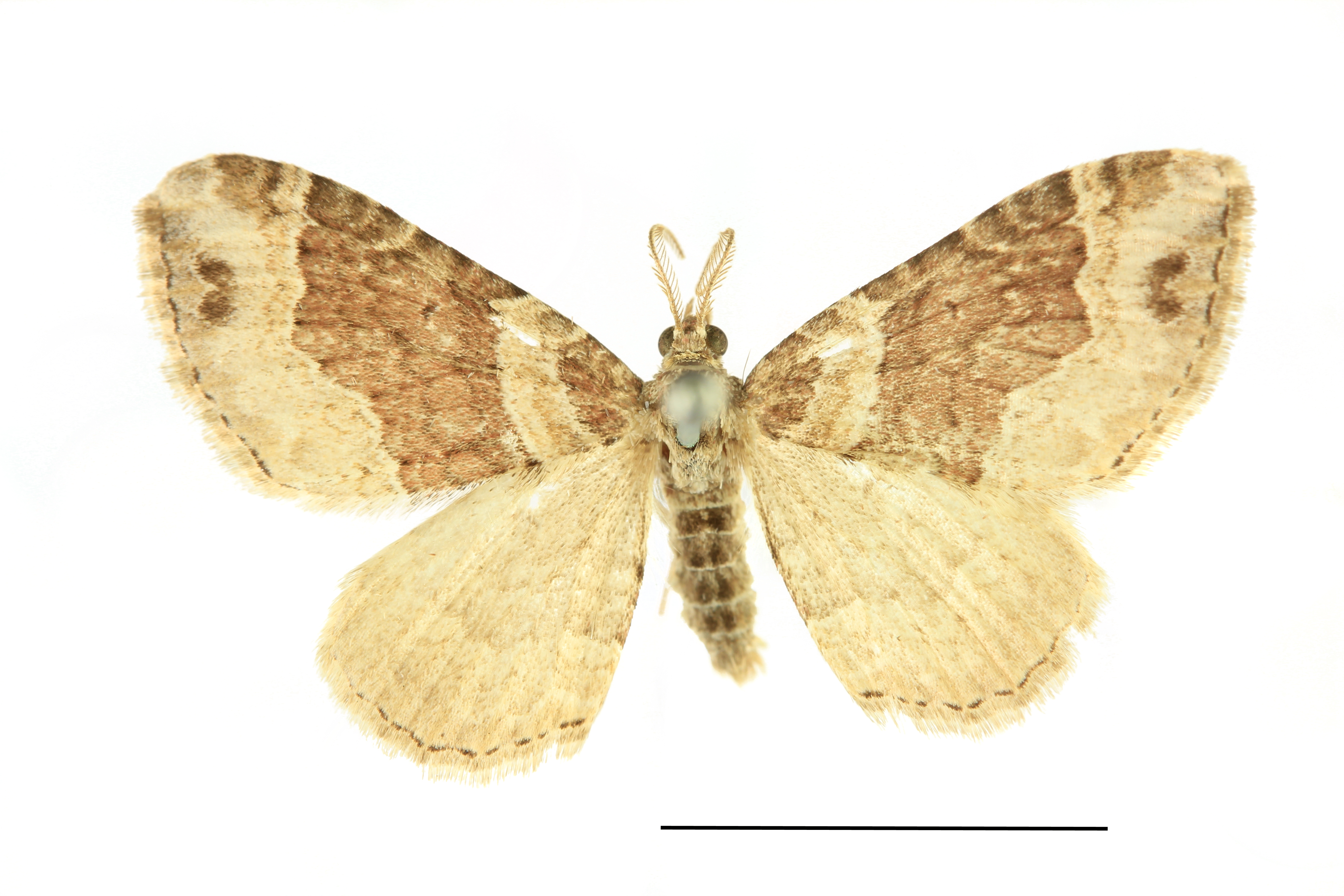

== Description ==
The name-typical form of ferrugata as figured by Clerck and well described by Linné, has the median band reddish or purplish, the distal area very weakly marked (except the costal patch and two dark spots between the radials) often almost entirely white or whitish. An aberration, ab. unidentaria Haw. is a very common and very interesting aberration which has been proved, by my very extensive breeding experiments and those of Dr. Draudt, to be an almost perfect Mendelian "recessive". It differs in having the median band black, not reddish. — ab. coarctata Prout has the median band greatly narrowed, only 1–2 mm. in width; the rest of the markings often in part obsolete. - bilbainensis Fuchs, from Bilbao, said to be a local race, is described as smaller, narrower-winged, the distal edge of the median band more distinctly biangulate. I doubt its validity. — stupida Alph., from Issyk-kul, Tibet, W. Central China, etc., is rather larger, with whiter hindwing otherwise similar to ab. unidentaria. Xanthorhoe ferrugata is difficult to certainly distinguish from Xanthorhoe spadicearia (Denis & Schiffermüller, 1775). See Townsend et al. Xanthorhoe biriviata and Xanthorhoe vidanoi The larva is long and slender, naked except for a few short bristles and grey with some darker spots on the back.

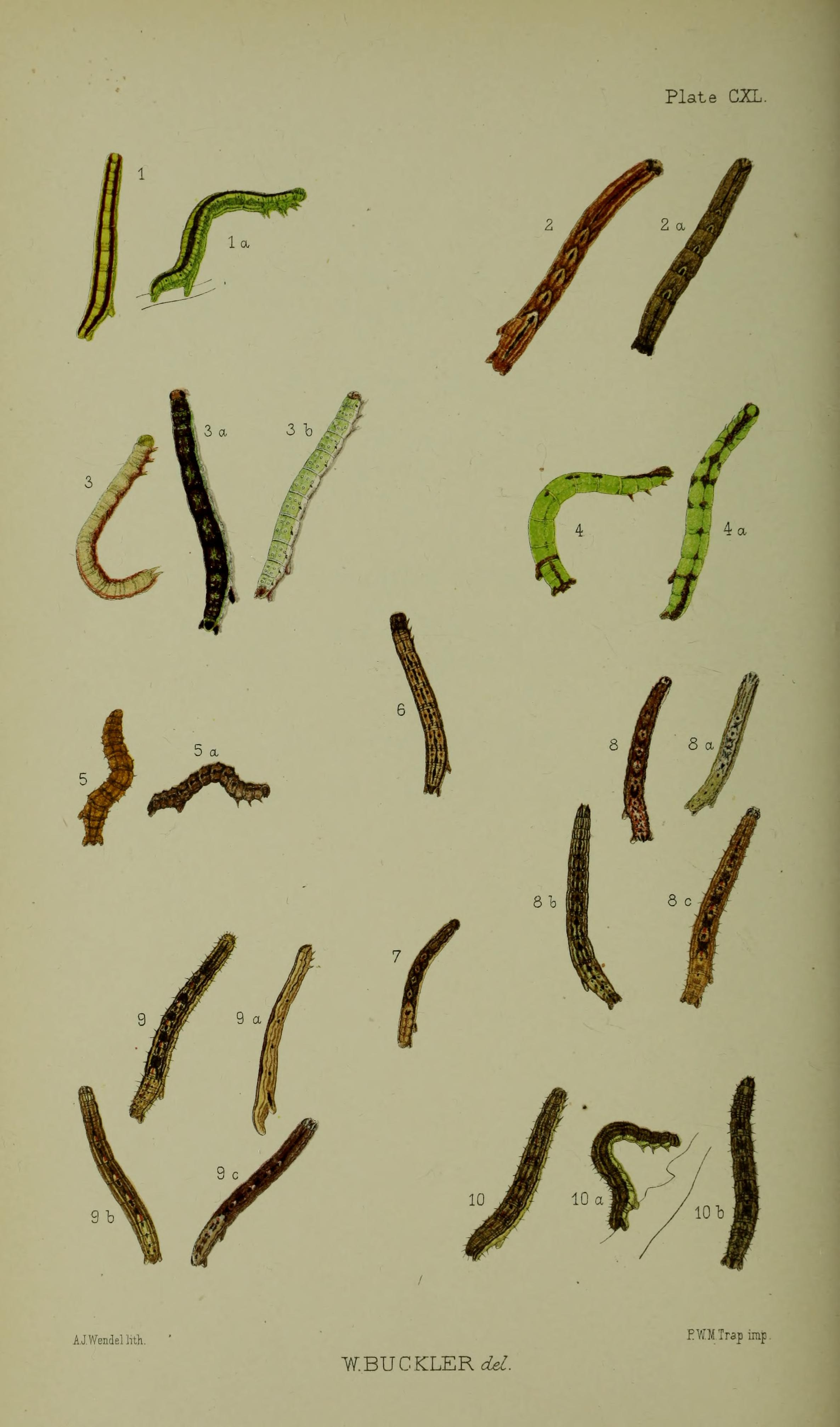
Figs 8, 8a, 8b, 8c larvae in various stages Figs 9, 9a, 9b, 9c larvae after final moult

== Subspecies ==
- Xanthorhoe ferrugata ferrugata (Clerck, 1759)
- Xanthorhoe ferrugata fuscata (Nordström, 1935) Not recognized as a subspecies by all authors.
- Xanthorhoe ferrugata alaskae Cassino & Swett, 1925 (Alaska, Yakutat)
- Xanthorhoe ferrugata bilbainensis Fuchs, 1898 (Spain, Bilbao)
- Xanthorhoe ferrugata infumata Barnes & McDunnough, 1917 (USA, Oregon Crater Lake)
- Xanthorhoe ferrugata malaisei Djakonov, 1929 (Kamchatka, Petropavlovsk-Kamchatsky)

== Biology ==
There are two generations per year in Central Europe, flying from late April to early July and from early July to mid-September. The larvae of the first generation can be observed from August to September, the second generation from June to July. The pupae of the first generation hibernate. The larvae feed on species of Galium, Stellaria, Campanula and Cirsium.
