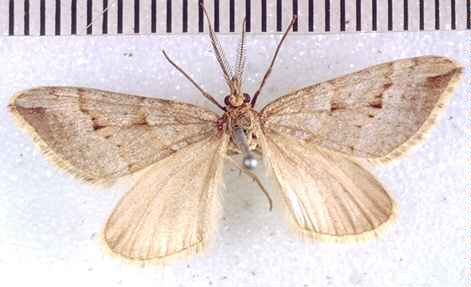
- Male

Scientific classification
- Kingdom: Animalia
- Phylum: Arthropoda
- Class: Insecta
- Order: Lepidoptera
- Family: Geometridae
- Genus: Xanthorhoe
- Species: X. orophylloides

Binomial name
- Xanthorhoe orophylloides Hudson, 1909

Synonyms
- Xanthorhoe subantarctica Salmon, 1956; Helastia orophylloides (Hudson, 1909)

= Xanthorhoe orophylloides =

Species of moth endemic to New Zealand

Xanthorhoe orophylloides is a moth of the family Geometridae. It was first described by George Hudson in 1909 and is endemic to New Zealand. This species is found in the subantarctic islands including at the Auckland Islands and at Campbell Island.

== Taxonomy ==
This species was first described by Hudson in 1909 using specimens collected at the North Arm of Carnley Harbour at the Auckland Islands and also at Campbell Island. In 1928 Hudson, in his seminal work The butterflies and moths of New Zealand, again discussed and illustrated this species. In 1971 J. S. Dugdale placed this species in the genus Helastia. The genus Helastia was restricted by R. C. Craw in 1987 placing this species into the genus Xanthorhoe. This placement was accepted in 1988 by Dugdale. The male holotype specimen, collected at Carnley Harbour, is held at Te Papa.

== Description ==
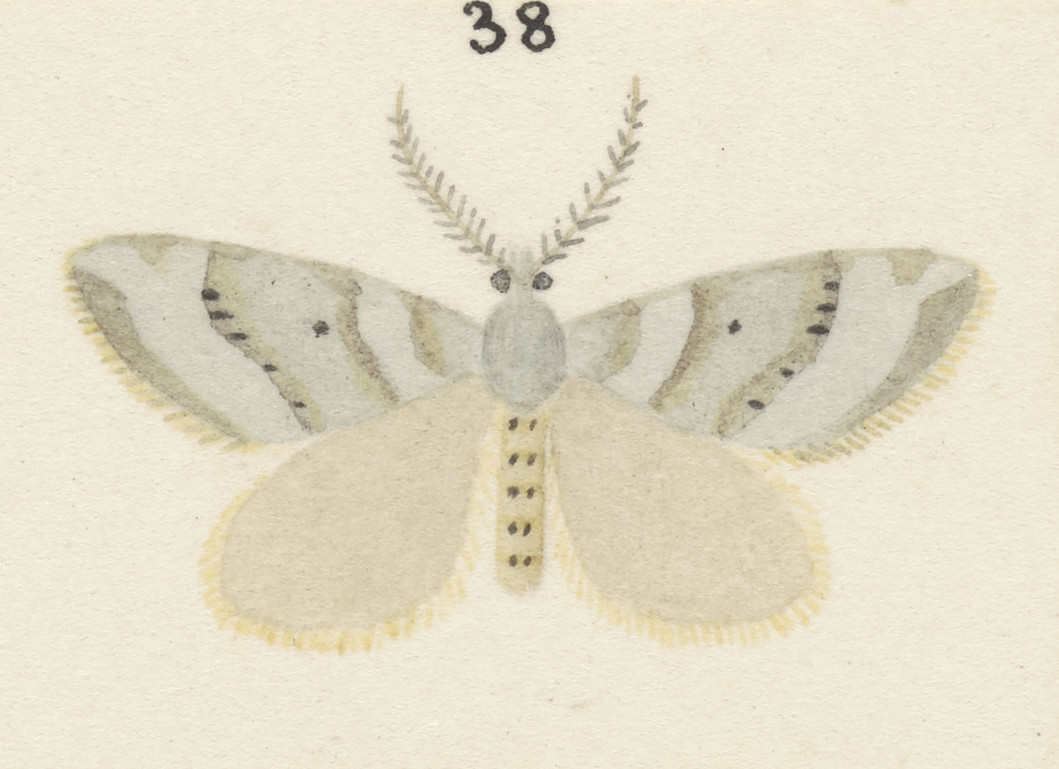
Illustration of X. orophylloides

Hudson described this species as follows:

The expansion of the wings is 1 1/2 in. The head is brownish-grey. The antennae are moderately bipectinated. The thorax and abdomen are pale grey, the latter with the segmental divisions dull ochreous; there are also two black dots on the back of each segment. The forewings are rather narrow, with the apex somewhat acute, and the termen slightly curved oblique, pale bluish-grey with pale brownish-black markings; a rather faint transverse line at about 1/3 strongly marked on the cell by a cloudy wedge-shaped mark; a stronger transverse line at 3/4 well marked by a series of dark marks on each of the veins, those nearest the cell being considerably larger than the rest; a fairly distinct terminal shading of dark grey and a large wedge-shaped pale apical area; the median hand generally is paler and browner than the rest of the wing. The hindwings are pale grey. The cilia are greyish- white, with a few brownish-black scales only.

X. orophylloides is similar in appearance to X. orophyla and Epyaxa rosearia but may be easily separated as X. orophylloides has narrower wings.

== Distribution ==
This species is endemic to New Zealand. It is found in the subantarctic islands including at the Auckland Islands and at Campbell Island.
