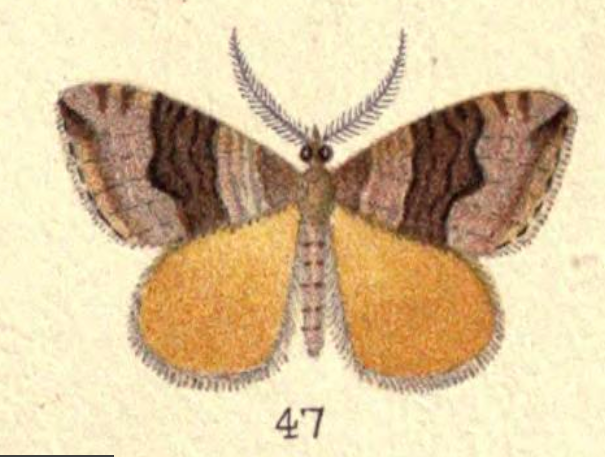
- Male
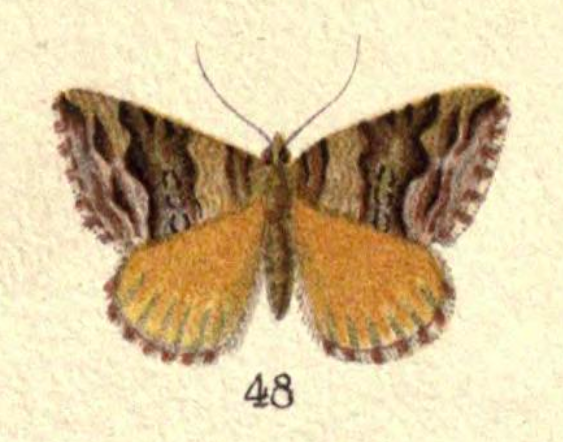
- Female

Scientific classification
- Kingdom: Animalia
- Phylum: Arthropoda
- Clade: Pancrustacea
- Class: Insecta
- Order: Lepidoptera
- Family: Geometridae
- Genus: Xanthorhoe
- Species: X. lophogramma

Binomial name
- Xanthorhoe lophogramma Meyrick, 1897

Synonyms
- Larentia lophogramma (Meyrick, 1897)

= Xanthorhoe lophogramma =

Species of moth

Xanthorhoe lophogramma is a species of moth in the family Geometridae. It is endemic to New Zealand and if found in the South Island. This species inhabits dry beech scrub but its larval host is unknown. Adult moths are on the wing in January. In 2025 this species was classified as "data deficient" under the New Zealand Threat Classification System.

== Taxonomy ==
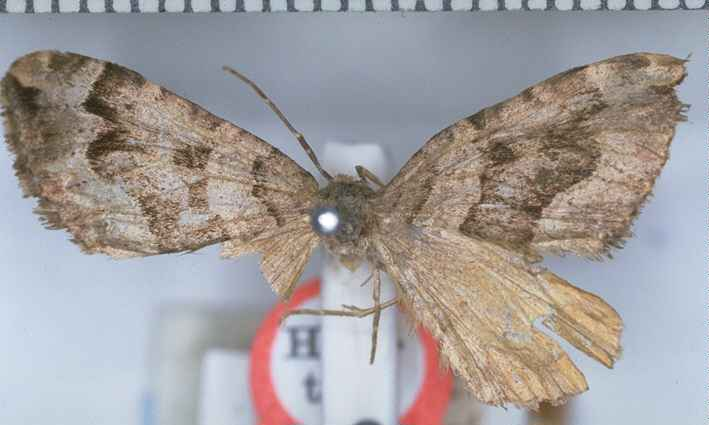
Type specimen of Xanthorhoe lophogramma

This species was first described by Edward Meyrick in 1897 using a specimen collected by George Hudson at Castle Hill. Hudson discovered this species in January 1893 and discussed and illustrated it in both his 1898 and 1928 books. In 1939 L. B. Prout proposed that the species be moved to the genus Larentia, however this proposal did not gain acceptance. The holotype species is held at the Natural History Museum, London. This species is regarded as having a dubious taxonomic status. At present this species is in an unrevised group and is regarded by some experts as lacking clear diagnostic features and not being distinguishable from X. semifissata. Despite this, it was classified as having a New Zealand Threat Classification status in 2017.

== Description ==
Meyrick described the species as follows:

♂︎ 27 mm. Head and thorax grey-whitish, irrorated with fuscous and black. Anteunal pectinations, a 7, b 8. Forewings with termen slightly waved, oblique; fuscous-whitish, irrorated with fuscous; a stria near base, and edge of basal patch dark fuscous, curved; median band formed by two fasciae of three suffused dark fuscous striae each, outermost blackish, anterior edge curved, posterior edge with a rectangular projection at 1/4 from costa and a broader rounded prominence in middle, indentation between these rounded-angular, abrupt; fifth fascia indicated by a fuscous costal suffusion; sixth suffusedly fuscous, with a triangular blackish-fuscous spot below apex, edged above with a whitish-ochreous suffusion : cilia fuscous, terminal half obscurely spotted with whitish. Hindwings dull ochreous-yellowish.

Although very similar in appearance to its close relative X. semifissata, Meyrick states it can be distinguished from that species by the distinctive form of the posterior edge of the median band and the less distinct pale striae beyond it. Hudson also points out that the hindwings are dark ochreous in colour and lack the transverse markings of X. semifissata.

== Distribution ==
X. lophogramma is endemic to New Zealand. It can be found in Marlborough, North Canterbury, Mid Canterbury, Mackenzie and Central Otago areas.

== Biology and behaviour ==
This species prefers lowland habitat of dry beech scrub. It is on the wing in January.

== Host species and habitat ==
The host plants for the larvae of this species are unknown but are likely to be low growing herbs in the family Brassicaceae.

== Conservation status ==
In 2025 this species was classified by the New Zealand Department of Conservation as "data deficient" under the New Zealand Threat Classification System. This species is data poor as a result of the difficulty in identifying the species. It has been hypothesised that this species is in need of conservation in Canterbury as much of its lowland habitat is now highly modified by introduced plants.
