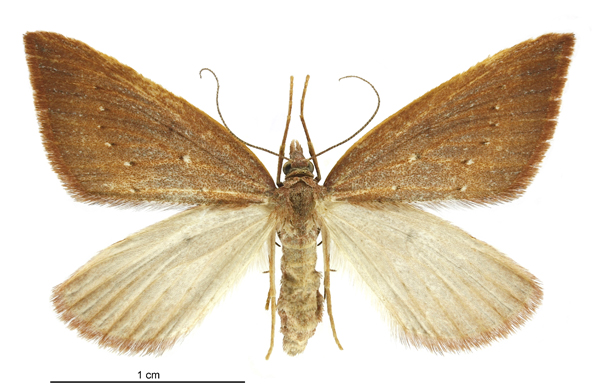
- Female
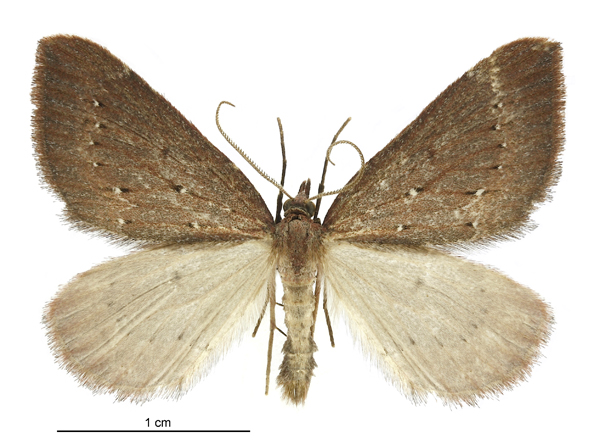
- Male

Scientific classification
- Kingdom: Animalia
- Phylum: Arthropoda
- Clade: Pancrustacea
- Class: Insecta
- Order: Lepidoptera
- Family: Geometridae
- Genus: Xanthorhoe
- Species: X. occulta

Binomial name
- Xanthorhoe occulta Philpott, 1903

Synonyms
- Xanthorrhoe occulta Philpott, 1903

= Xanthorhoe occulta =

Species of moth endemic to New Zealand

Xanthorhoe occulta is a species of moth in the family Geometridae. It is endemic to New Zealand and was first described by Alfred Philpott in 1903. It is found in the North, South and Stewart Islands. The adult moths are on the wing from

== Taxonomy ==
This species was first described by Alfred Philpott in 1903 and originally named Xanthorrhoe occult. Philpott used male specimens collected at West Plains, Invercargill. The male holotype has been lost but the two male paratype specimens are held in the New Zealand Arthropod Collection.

== Description ==
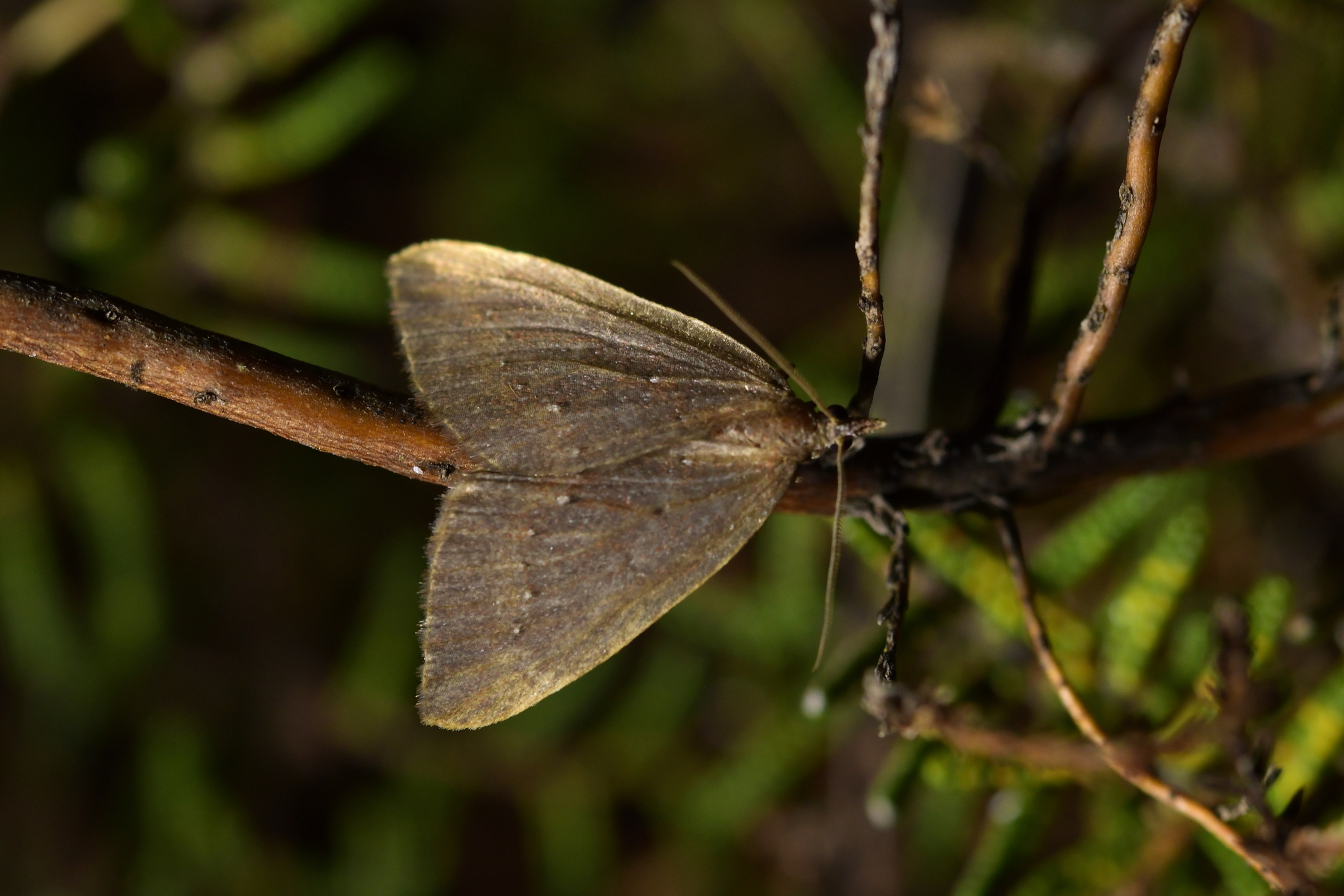
Observation of live male X. occulta.

Philpott described the male adult of this species as follows:

♂. 28 mm. Head and thorax dull yellowish – brown. Legs and abdomen paler. Antennas shortly bipectinated. Fore wings dull yellowish – brown, sometimes with reddish tinge, more pronounced near base; a white dot posteriorly black-margined on vein 1 at 1/3; a similar dot near origin of vein 2; a chain of similar dots, black-margined anteriorly, from 3/4 costa to 3/4 dorsum. Cilia reddish-brown. Hind wings very pale whitish-yellow. Cilia same colour.

The female of this species have wings that are reduced in size.

== Distribution and habitat ==
This species has been observed in the North, South and Stewart Islands, including in the Tararua Range, at Mount Arthur, Arthur's Pass, Otira, Dunedin and Invercargill in the South Island. In the North Island and the northern parts of the South Island this species appears to inhabit sub-alpine forest glades. However further south in the southern parts of the South Island and on Stewart Island this species can be found in lowland habitat.

== Behaviour ==
The adults of this species are on the wing from October to February. The adult moths are attracted to light and have been collected via a mercury vapour light trap.

== Host plant ==
Larvae of this species have been observed feeding on herbs.
