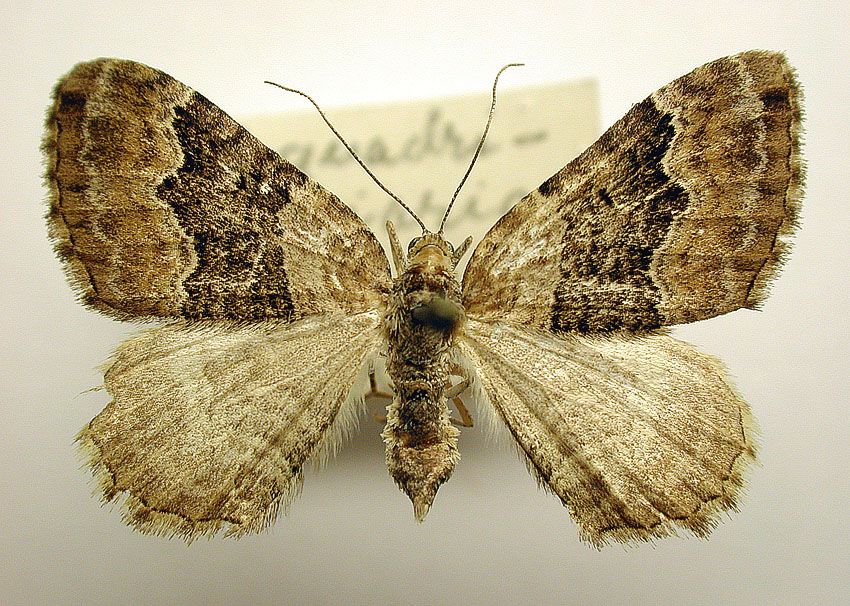

Scientific classification
- Domain: Eukaryota
- Kingdom: Animalia
- Phylum: Arthropoda
- Class: Insecta
- Order: Lepidoptera
- Family: Geometridae
- Genus: Xanthorhoe
- Species: X. quadrifasiata

Binomial name
- Xanthorhoe quadrifasiata (Clerck, 1759)

Synonyms
- Phalaena quadrifasciata Clerck, 1759; Ochyria quadrifasiata (Clerck, 1759); Xanthorhoe quadrifasciata (misspelling)

= Xanthorhoe quadrifasiata =

Large twin-spot carpet

Species of moth

Xanthorhoe quadrifasiata, the large twin-spot carpet, is a moth of the family Geometridae. It is found in most of Europe (except Portugal, Ireland, Iceland and Greece), east to the Near East and the eastern part of the Palearctic realm.

The wingspan is 29–32 mm. Adults are on wing from June to July. There is one generation per year.

The larvae feed on various low-growing plants, including Ribes rubrum and Galium mollugo.
