= Xanthorhoe iduata =

Scientific classification
- Kingdom: Animalia
- Phylum: Arthropoda
- Class: Insecta
- Order: Lepidoptera
- Family: Geometridae
- Tribe: Xanthorhoini
- Genus: Xanthorhoe
- Species: X. iduata

Binomial name
- Xanthorhoe iduata (Guenée in Boisduval & Guenée, 1858)

Species of moth

Xanthorhoe iduata is a species of geometrid moth in the family Geometridae. It is found in North America.

The MONA or Hodges number for Xanthorhoe iduata is 7371.
