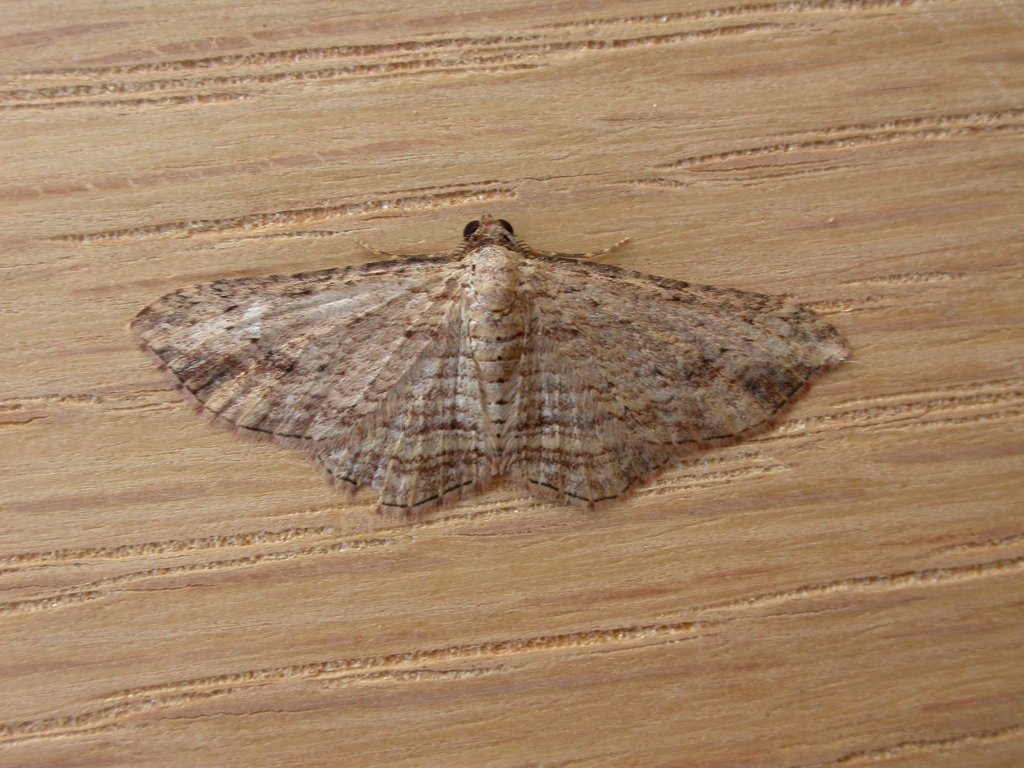

Scientific classification
- Kingdom: Animalia
- Phylum: Arthropoda
- Class: Insecta
- Order: Lepidoptera
- Family: Geometridae
- Genus: Xanthorhoe
- Species: X. anaspila

Binomial name
- Xanthorhoe anaspila Meyrick, 1891

= Xanthorhoe anaspila =

Species of moth

Xanthorhoe anaspila is a species of moth of the family Geometridae first described by Edward Meyrick in 1891.
