= Xanthorhoe molata =

Scientific classification
- Kingdom: Animalia
- Phylum: Arthropoda
- Class: Insecta
- Order: Lepidoptera
- Family: Geometridae
- Genus: Xanthorhoe
- Species: X. molata

Binomial name
- Xanthorhoe molata Felder, 1875

Species of moth

Xanthorhoe molata is a moth of the family Geometridae first described by Felder in 1875. It is found in Sri Lanka.
