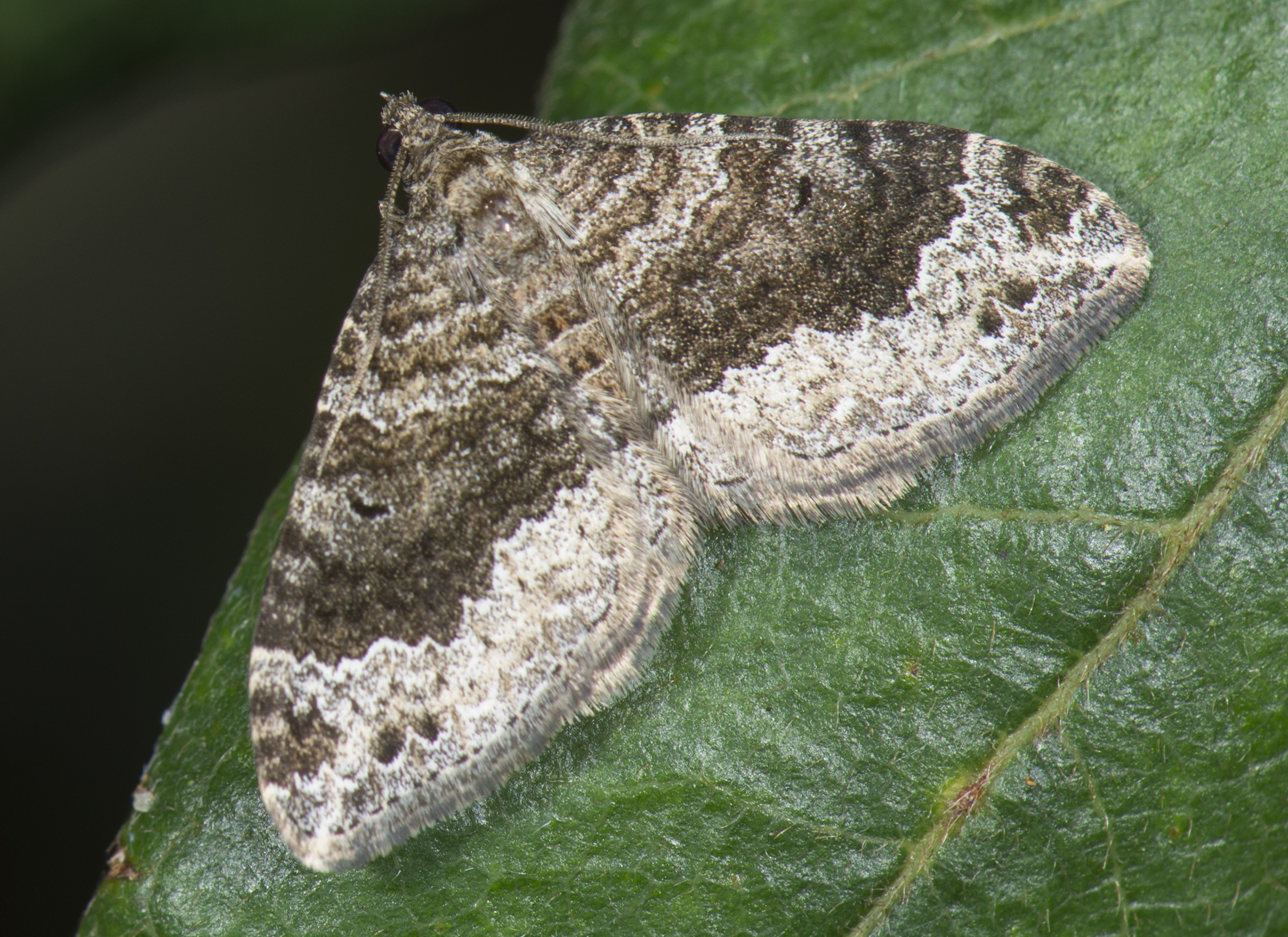

Scientific classification
- Kingdom: Animalia
- Phylum: Arthropoda
- Class: Insecta
- Order: Lepidoptera
- Family: Geometridae
- Genus: Xanthorhoe
- Species: X. saturata

Binomial name
- Xanthorhoe saturata Guenée, 1857

= Xanthorhoe saturata =

Species of moth

Xanthorhoe saturata is a moth of the family Geometridae.
