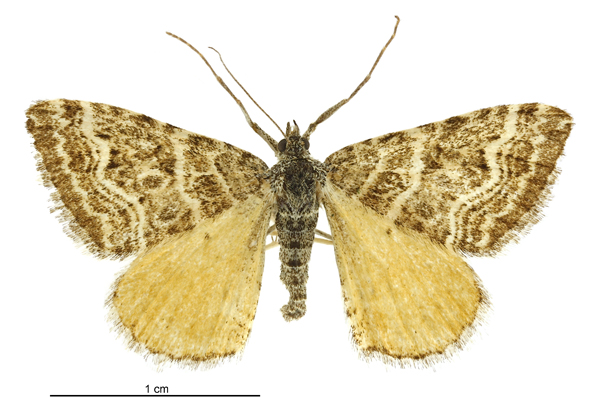
- Female
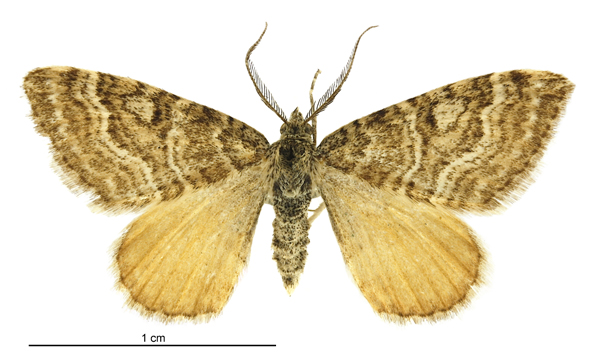
- Male

Conservation status
- Nationally Critical (NZ TCS)

Scientific classification
- Kingdom: Animalia
- Phylum: Arthropoda
- Class: Insecta
- Order: Lepidoptera
- Family: Geometridae
- Genus: Xanthorhoe
- Species: X. bulbulata

Binomial name
- Xanthorhoe bulbulata (Guenée, 1868)

Synonyms
- Cidaria bulbulata Guenée, 1868; Larentia bulbulata (Guenée,1868)

= Xanthorhoe bulbulata =

Species of moth endemic to New Zealand

Xanthorhoe bulbulata is a species of moth in the family Geometridae. It is endemic to New Zealand. It is classified as critically endangered by the Department of Conservation.

== Taxonomy ==
X. bulbulata was first described by Achille Guenée in 1868. In 1883 Edward Meyrick placed the species within the genus Larentia. In 1898 George Vernon Hudson assigned the species to the genus Xanthorhoe. L. B. Prout, in 1939, again placed this species within the genus Larentia. In 1971 J. S. Dugdale disagreed with the placement and included this species within the genus Helastia. However this was not agreed with by R. C. Craw and in 1987 he placed the species within the genus Xanthorhoe. In 1988 Dugdale agreed with Craw's placement. The female holotype specimen is found at the Natural History Museum, London.

== Original description ==
Guenée described the species as follows:

Superior wings wood-brown, varied with pale and dark; the fringe concolorons, preceded by small geminated black dots; there are four white lines, the two first parallel and somewhat angulated, the third forming a band, divided by an interrupted white thread and followed by another very slender brownish line, the fourth simple, continuous and slightly shaky, no sub-apical line : inferior wings dark ochreous-yellow without any line, and simply with black terminal markings : under-side of all the wings ochreous-yellow without markings, excepting that on the inferior there is a little cellular dot, and a series of very small and distant black dots. Abdomen grey with several black atoms.

== Distribution and habitat ==
This species is endemic to New Zealand. Historically this moth was distributed throughout much of the South Island with records obtained from as far north as Awapiri in the Awatere valley down to Invercargill. The moths could be found in "open, grassy places" from sea level to elevations of 660-930m. Records suggest that the moth was once "common" between September and March.

== Species decline ==
Despite having been common in New Zealand up to the 1930s, since 1 January 1940 there have been only two recorded collections of X. bulbulata. These were a male found flying during the day in Queenstown in 1979 and a female caught in a light trap between February and March 1991 at the Eastern entrance to the Kawarau Gorge. Intensive sampling for this moth covering 285 sites between 1995 and 2000 returned no specimens. However it has been hypothesised that the species may still exist and that it could be rediscovered if an extensive search in the beginning months of its flight period were undertaken at low altitude areas of the South Island or at mountainous sites during the later summer months.

It is thought that the documented decline in this species is the result of ecological changes to habitats following European settlement.

== Conservation status ==
This species has the "Nationally Critical" conservation status under the New Zealand Threat Classification System. This species is feared extinct.
