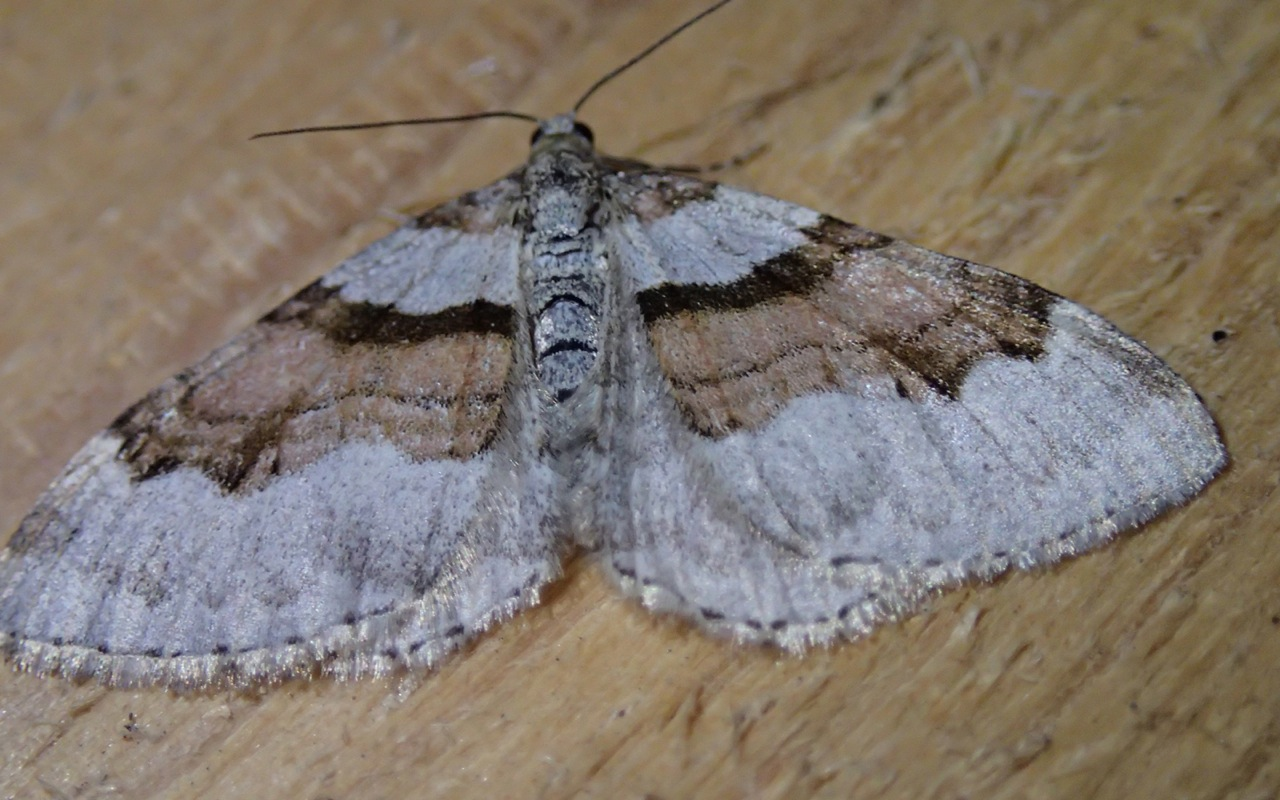

Scientific classification
- Kingdom: Animalia
- Phylum: Arthropoda
- Clade: Pancrustacea
- Class: Insecta
- Order: Lepidoptera
- Family: Geometridae
- Genus: Xanthorhoe
- Species: X. labradorensis

Binomial name
- Xanthorhoe labradorensis (Packard, 1867)

Synonyms
- Coremia labradorensis Packard, 1867; Gypsochroa emendata Pearsall, 1914

= Xanthorhoe labradorensis =

Labrador carpet moth

Species of moth

Xanthorhoe labradorensis, the Labrador carpet moth, is a moth of the family Geometridae. The species was first described by Alpheus Spring Packard in 1867. It is found across Canada from Newfoundland and Labrador to British Columbia and Alaska, north to Yukon and the Northwest Territories, south in the east to Louisiana and Mississippi. The habitat consists of open wooded areas and edges.

The wingspan is about 25 mm. There is one generation per year with adults on wing from late May to late August in the northern part of the range.
