= Xanthorhoe mirabilata =

Scientific classification
- Kingdom: Animalia
- Phylum: Arthropoda
- Class: Insecta
- Order: Lepidoptera
- Family: Geometridae
- Genus: Xanthorhoe
- Species: X. mirabilata

Binomial name
- Xanthorhoe mirabilata (Grote, 1883)

Species of moth

Xanthorhoe mirabilata is a species of geometrid moth in the family Geometridae.

This moth's typical range is the south-western United States, primarily Arizona, New Mexico, and Colorado.

The MONA or Hodges number for Xanthorhoe mirabilata is 7392.
