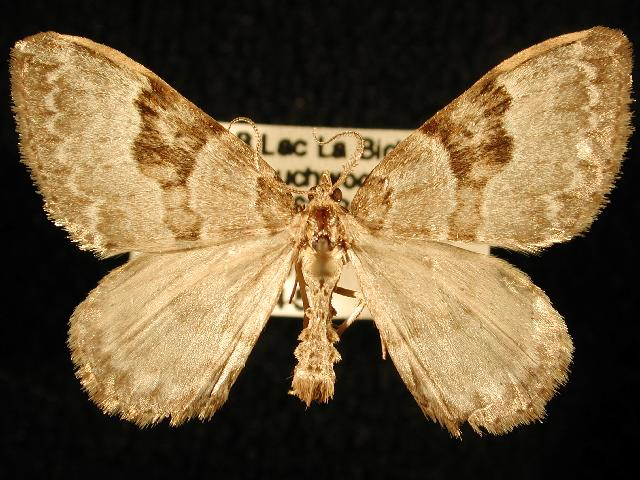

Scientific classification
- Domain: Eukaryota
- Kingdom: Animalia
- Phylum: Arthropoda
- Class: Insecta
- Order: Lepidoptera
- Family: Geometridae
- Genus: Xanthorhoe
- Species: X. fossaria

Binomial name
- Xanthorhoe fossaria Taylor, 1906

= Xanthorhoe fossaria =

Species of moth

Xanthorhoe fossaria is a species of geometrid moth in the family Geometridae. It is found in North America.

The MONA or Hodges number for Xanthorhoe fossaria is 7380.
