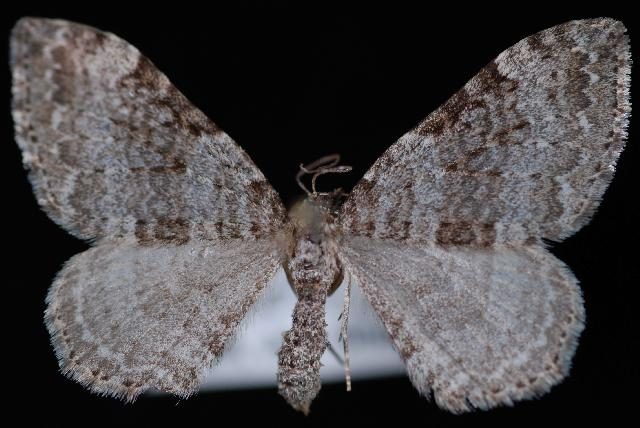

Scientific classification
- Kingdom: Animalia
- Phylum: Arthropoda
- Class: Insecta
- Order: Lepidoptera
- Family: Geometridae
- Genus: Xanthorhoe
- Species: X. macdunnoughi

Binomial name
- Xanthorhoe macdunnoughi Swett, 1918

= Xanthorhoe macdunnoughi =

Species of moth

Xanthorhoe macdunnoughi is a species of moth in the family Geometridae (geometrid moths). It was first described by Louis W. Swett in 1918 and is found in North America, where it has been recorded from open wooded areas in western North America, ranging east to western Alberta and south to California.

The wingspan is about 28 mm. Adults are mottled grey, with a darker grey median band on the forewings.

The MONA or Hodges number for Xanthorhoe macdunnoughi is 7372.
