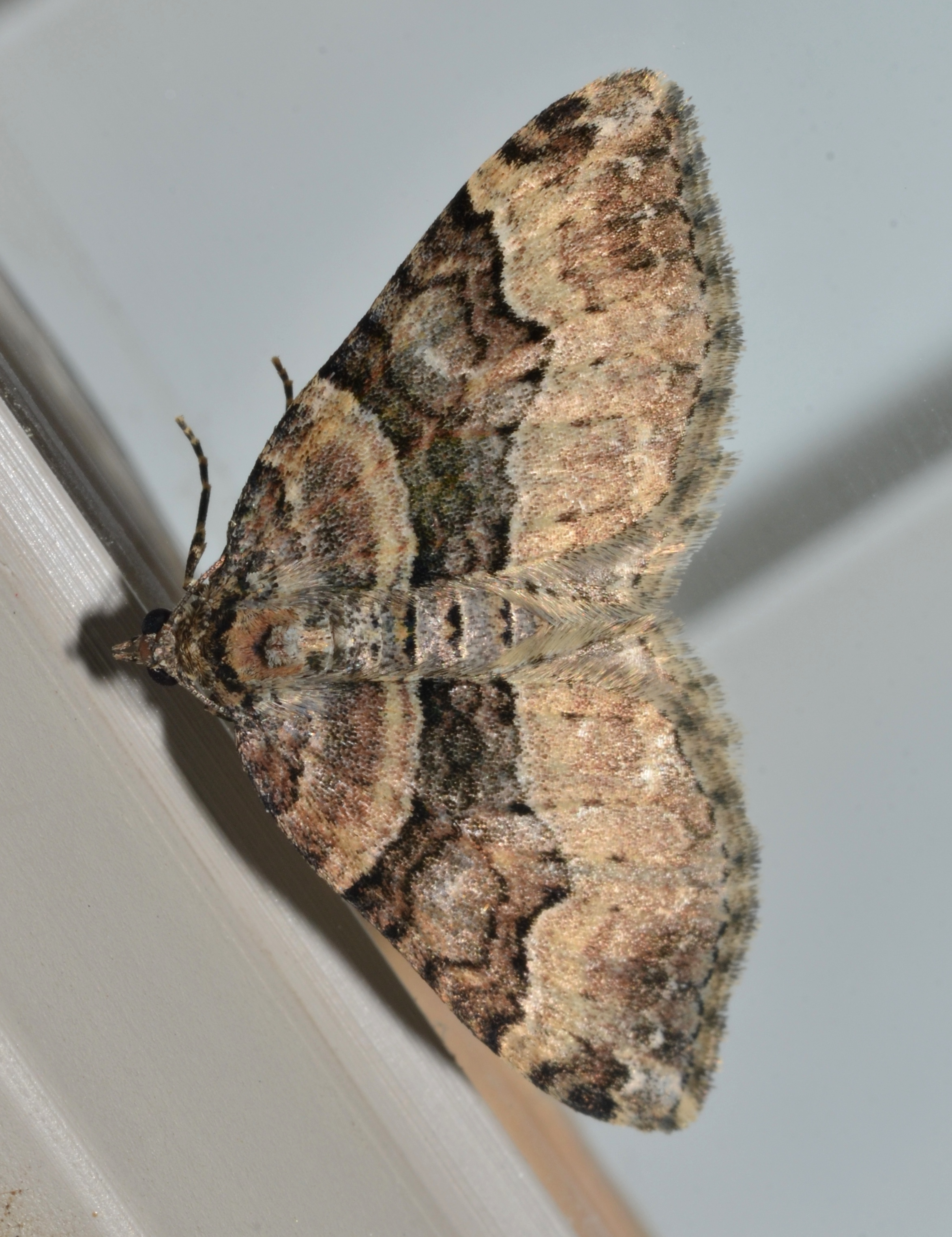

Scientific classification
- Kingdom: Animalia
- Phylum: Arthropoda
- Clade: Pancrustacea
- Class: Insecta
- Order: Lepidoptera
- Family: Geometridae
- Tribe: Xanthorhoini
- Genus: Xanthorhoe
- Species: X. lacustrata

Binomial name
- Xanthorhoe lacustrata (Guenée in Boisduval & Guenée, 1858)

= Xanthorhoe lacustrata =

Species of moth

Xanthorhoe lacustrata, the toothed brown carpet moth, is a species of geometrid moth in the family Geometridae. It is found in North America.

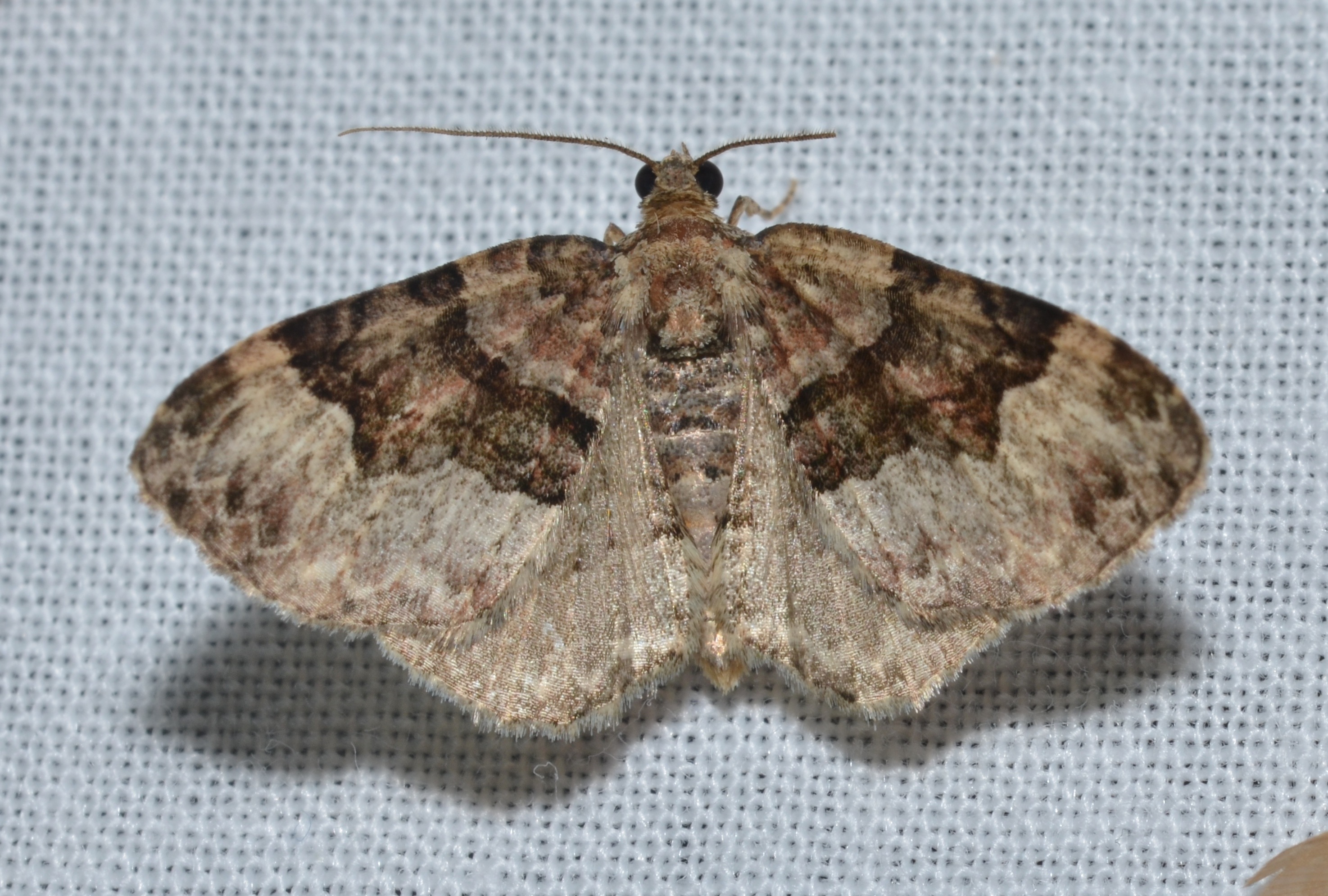
Toothed brown carpet moth, Xanthorhoe lacustrata
