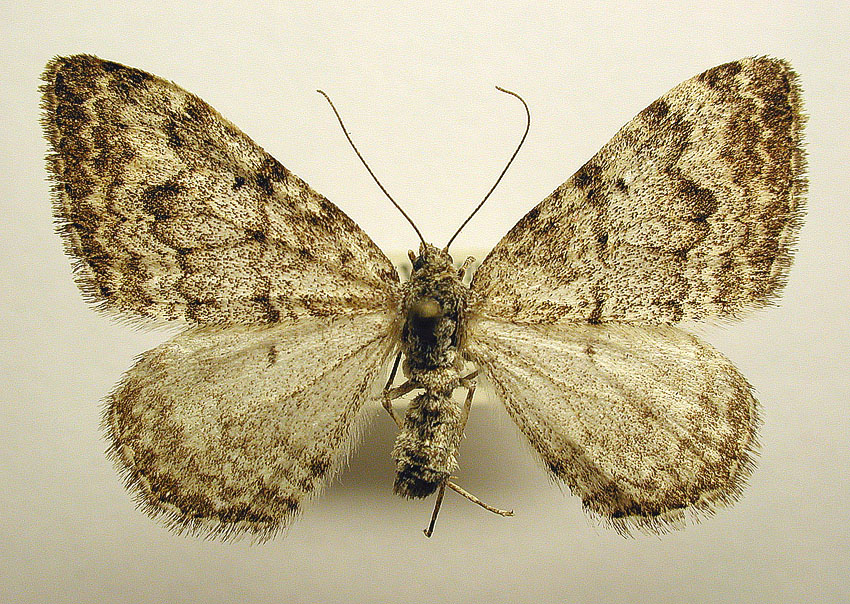

Scientific classification
- Domain: Eukaryota
- Kingdom: Animalia
- Phylum: Arthropoda
- Class: Insecta
- Order: Lepidoptera
- Family: Geometridae
- Genus: Xanthorhoe
- Species: X. annotinata

Binomial name
- Xanthorhoe annotinata (Zetterstedt, 1839)

Synonyms
- Acidalia annotinata Zetterstedt, 1839

= Xanthorhoe annotinata =

Species of moth

Xanthorhoe annotinata is a moth of the family Geometridae. It is found in the northern part of the Palearctic realm. It is found in mountainous areas.

The wingspan is 22–30 mm. There is one generation per year with adults on wing from mid June to July.

The larvae have been recorded feeding on Vaccinium myrtillus. Larvae can be found from July to May. The species overwinters in the larval stage.
