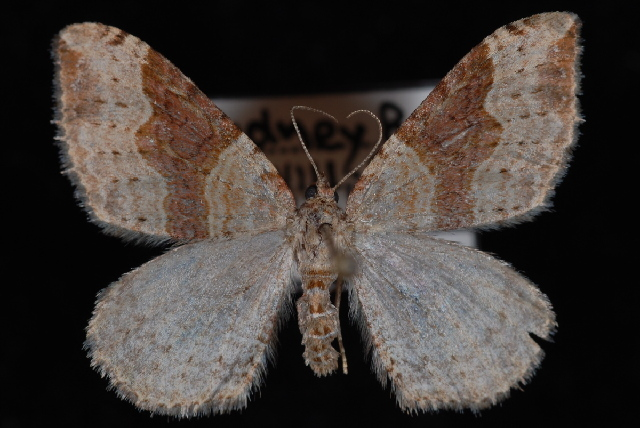

Scientific classification
- Kingdom: Animalia
- Phylum: Arthropoda
- Clade: Pancrustacea
- Class: Insecta
- Order: Lepidoptera
- Family: Geometridae
- Genus: Xanthorhoe
- Species: X. alticolata

Binomial name
- Xanthorhoe alticolata Barnes & McDunnough, 1916

= Xanthorhoe alticolata =

Species of moth

Xanthorhoe alticolata is a species of moth in the family Geometridae that was first described by William Barnes and James Halliday McDunnough in 1916. It is found in North America.
