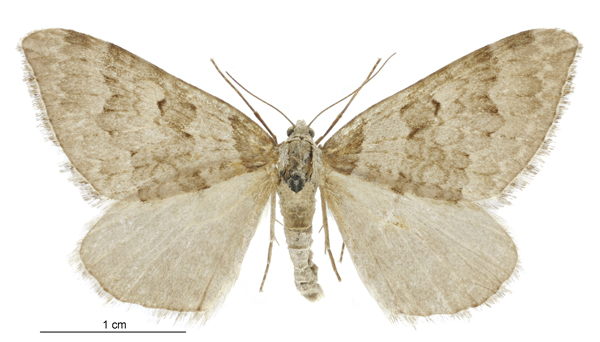
- Female
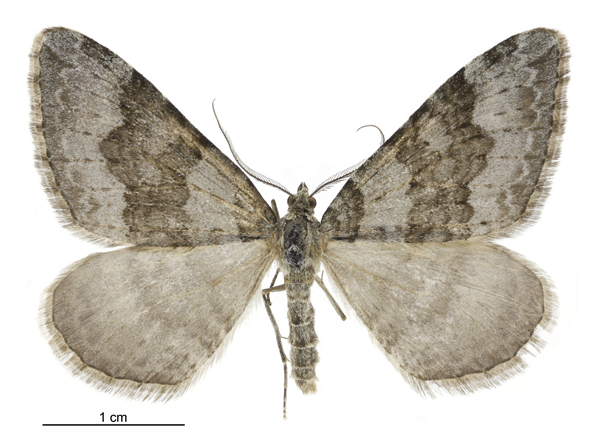
- Male

Conservation status
- Nationally Vulnerable (NZ TCS)

Scientific classification
- Kingdom: Animalia
- Phylum: Arthropoda
- Class: Insecta
- Order: Lepidoptera
- Family: Geometridae
- Genus: Xanthorhoe
- Species: X. frigida

Binomial name
- Xanthorhoe frigida Howes, 1946

= Xanthorhoe frigida =

Species of moth

Xanthorhoe frigida is a species of moth in the family Geometridae. It is endemic to New Zealand. The larvae of this species feeds on species in the plant genus Pachycladon including the threatened Pachycladon wallii. The adults of this species are on the wing from December to February. This moth is classified as nationally vulnerable by the Department of Conservation.

== Taxonomy ==
Xanthorhoe frigida was first described by George Howes in 1946 using a specimen collected by T. M. Smith at Homer in December 1944. The holotype specimen is held at Museum of New Zealand Te Papa Tongarewa.

== Description ==
Howes described the species as follows:

Wing expanse 35mm. Head and face grey. Antennae grey with fairly long ciliations. Thorax grey with thin dark line transversely across shoulders. Abdomen silver-grey with dark brown marks at the base of each segment. Forewings grey, faintly brown tinged and crossed with grey-white lines. There is a small white patch at base in which a thin grey line runs centrally from costa to dorsum. First line dark grey, almost black, fading into a white patch on the basal side and edged on the terminal side with a narrow clear white line. Beyond this is a light grey area with a darker central line crossing the wing. The second line is white with a narrow grey line edging it on the basal side, and a dark grey patch on the terminal side. In the centre of this patch and half way across the wing there is a clear white which starts on the costa to swell out into an elongate oval area reaching halfway to the dorsum. The rest of this area is grey. Then follows a narrow white band centred with a thin grey line and edged with dark grey on the basal side. The outer terminal of the wing is grey with a brownish suffusion, and on this the subterminal line appears in clear white. All lines are bluntly indented. The veins are indicated by dark lines lightly dotted with minute white dots. On the termen at the vein endings there are distinct X marks in dark brown. Cilia grey-brown with a slight ocherous basal line. Lower wings silver grey with three faint grey transverse lines and an incomplete subterminal line. Cilia greyish-brown with slight darker tufts at the vein endings.

== Distribution and habitat ==
This species is endemic to New Zealand. This species can be found in Mackenzie, Central Otago, Otago Lakes and Fiordland areas. This species prefers subalpine/alpine habitat. As at 2000 this species was only known from 5 localities. Other than its type locality, the species has more recently been collected at Rastus Burn Basin, The Remarkables in December and February, the Eyre Ecological District, northern Southland, and in the alpine zone of the Ben Nevis Pastoral lease area, Central Otago.

== Host plants ==
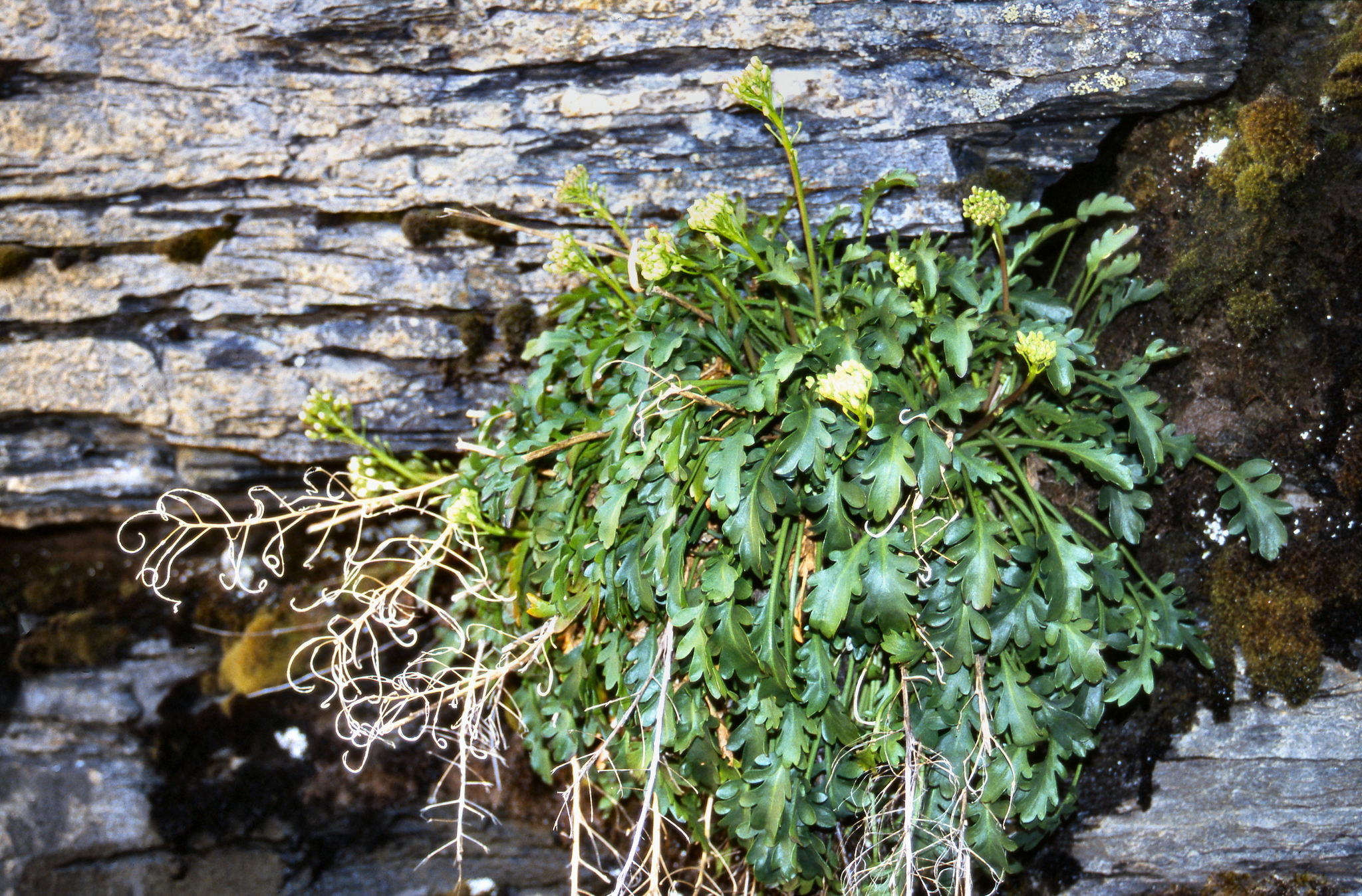
Pachycladon wallii, a host plant of X. frigida.

This species feeds on Pachycladon species. A host plant of this species is the at risk and naturally uncommon Pachycladon wallii.

== Conservation status ==
This species has the "Nationally Vulnerable" conservation status under the New Zealand Threat Classification System.
