= Xanthorhoe spadicearia =

Red twin-spot carpet

Scientific classification
- Kingdom: Animalia
- Phylum: Arthropoda
- Clade: Pancrustacea
- Class: Insecta
- Order: Lepidoptera
- Family: Geometridae
- Genus: Xanthorhoe
- Species: X. spadicearia

Binomial name
- Xanthorhoe spadicearia (Denis & Schiffermüller, 1775)

Species of moth

Xanthorhoe spadicearia, the red twin-spot carpet, is a moth of the genus Xanthorhoe in the family Geometridae. The species was first described by Michael Denis and Ignaz Schiffermüller in 1775.

== Distribution ==
It has a Palearctic range from Ireland through northern Europe then east to southern Siberia.It colonizes a variety of very different biotopes and occurs in both dry and humid and urban habitats. In the Alps, it rises to heights of 2100 metres.

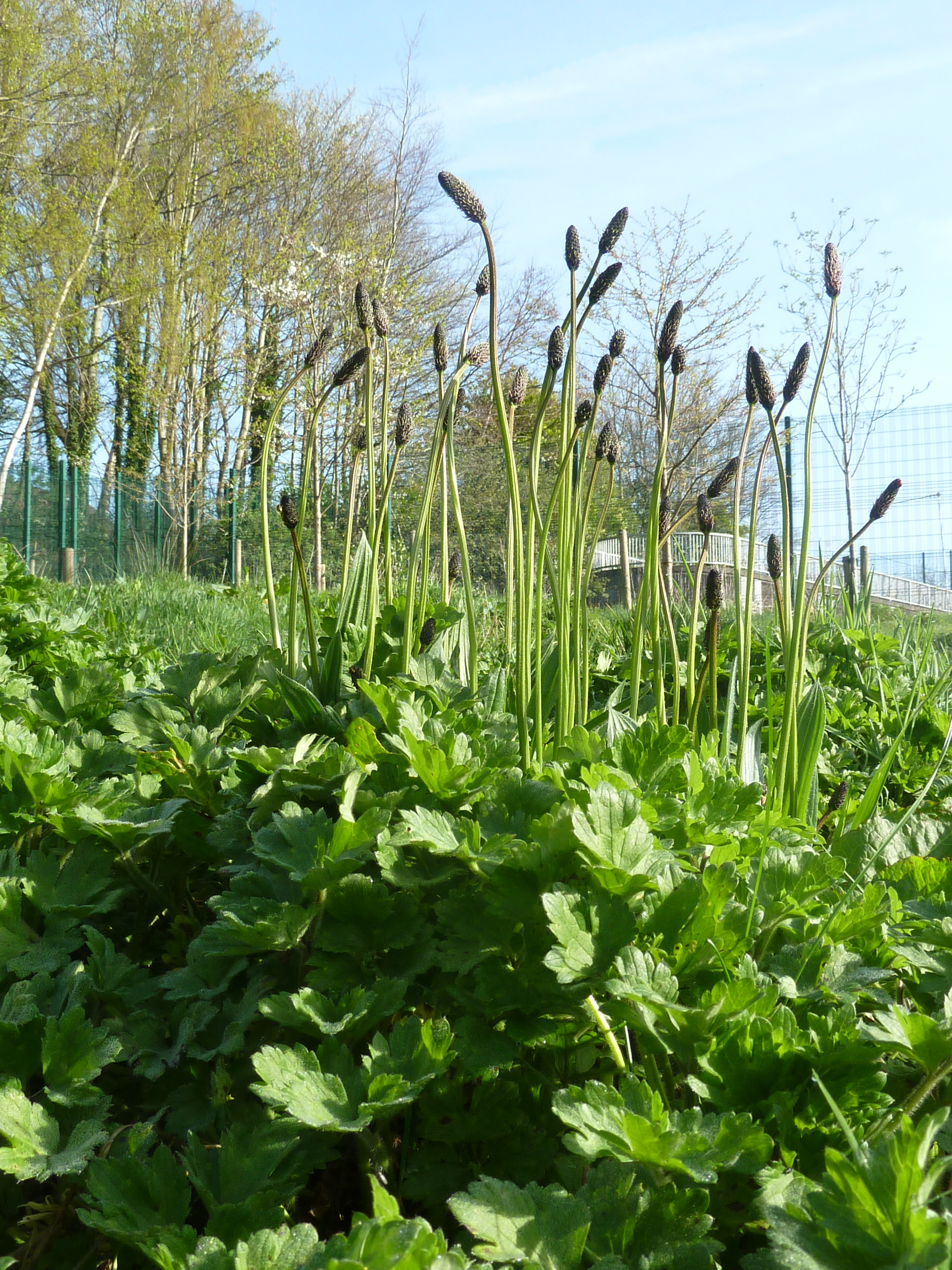
Habitat, Ireland

== Description ==
The forewing is strongly marked with lines, much mixed with ferruginous ochreous in the distal area or at least in the vicinity of the geminate dark spots, the median band differently shaped, often of a brighter or lighter red (less purplish), never black, the hindwing darker distally than proximally the under surface strongly mixed with ochreous. It is very variable. - ab. confixaria H.-Sch. has the median band narrowed and the distal area somewhat weakly marked, rather uniformly ochreous. - livinaria Lah. is probably, as Staudinger indicates, a very extreme aberration with threadlike median band and broadly darkened distal area— ab. georgi Meissl is an extraordinary, dark brown aberration with the median band only indicated by a narrow dark proximal bar and a narrow dark distal one, the latter only distinct costally. — ab. deletata Fuchs is nearly unicolorous grey, the forewing with reddish tinge basally and along the costal margin. - tromsoensis Fuchs is a prevalent form at high elevations and high latitudes, but scarcely a fixed geographical race; median band paler, sometimes almost obsolete, the lines which traverse it remaining distinct. Typical spadicearia, including the above-described aberrations, inhabits the greater part of Europe (except some southern localities) and is also found in Siberia (Tunka and Sajan). - asiatica Stgr., from the Tarbagatai district to Issyk-kul, is a very distinct race or possibly separate species with the ground-colour somewhat yellowish, rather copiously (especially in the distal area) marked with darker yellowish, the basal and median areas of the forewing very dull reddish to blackish, the latter much straighter-edged than in the other forms, the proximal half of the hindwing rather strongly darkened. Xanthorhoe spadicearia is difficult to certainly distinguish from Xanthorhoe ferrugata (Denis & Schiffermüller, 1775).See Townsend et al. Adult caterpillars are smooth and slender. They are ochre-coloured, brownish or greenish and show a dark brown dorsal line as well as light, black-brown diamond spots on the middle segments.

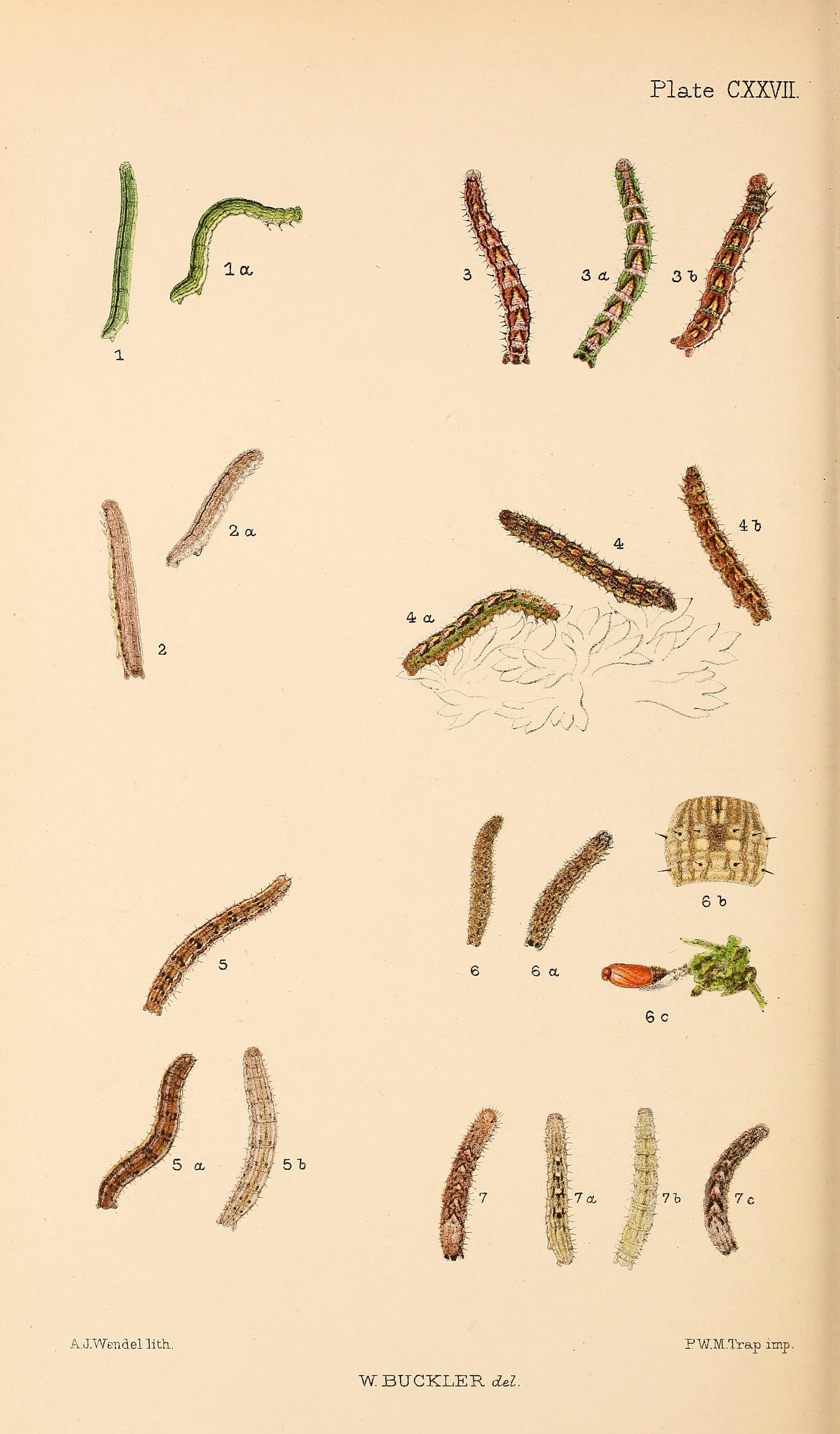
5,5a,5b larvae after final moult

== Biology ==
The larva feeds on species of Plantago and Vaccinium myrtillus
