= Xanthorhoe pontiaria =

Scientific classification
- Domain: Eukaryota
- Kingdom: Animalia
- Phylum: Arthropoda
- Class: Insecta
- Order: Lepidoptera
- Family: Geometridae
- Tribe: Xanthorhoini
- Genus: Xanthorhoe
- Species: X. pontiaria

Binomial name
- Xanthorhoe pontiaria Taylor, 1906

Species of moth

Xanthorhoe pontiaria is a species of geometrid moth in the family Geometridae. It is found in North America.

The MONA or Hodges number for Xanthorhoe pontiaria is 7379.
