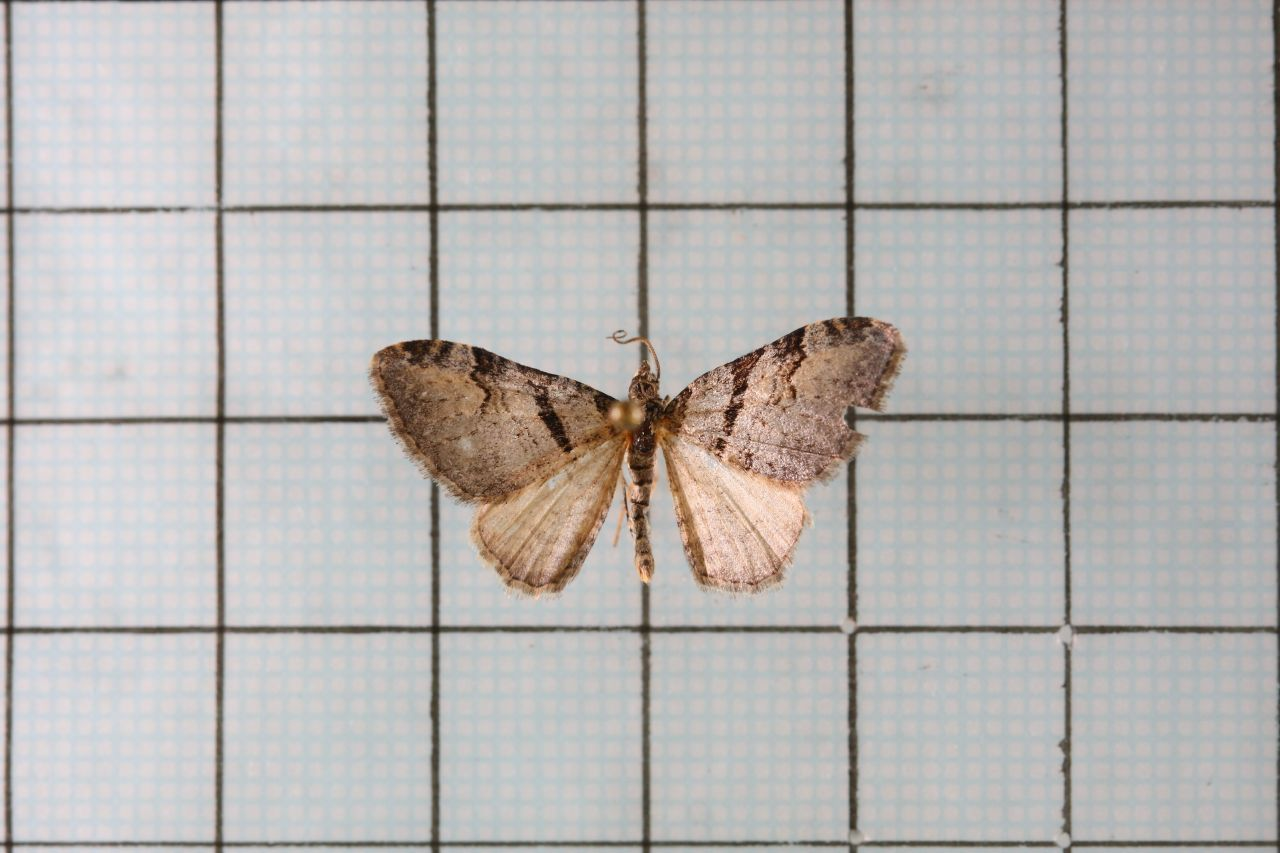

Scientific classification
- Kingdom: Animalia
- Phylum: Arthropoda
- Class: Insecta
- Order: Lepidoptera
- Family: Geometridae
- Genus: Xanthorhoe
- Species: X. mediofascia

Binomial name
- Xanthorhoe mediofascia (Wileman, 1915)

Synonyms
- Ochyria mediofascia Wileman, 1915

= Xanthorhoe mediofascia =

Species of moth

Xanthorhoe mediofascia is a species of moth of the family Geometridae. It was first described by Alfred Ernest Wileman in 1915. It is endemic to Taiwan.
