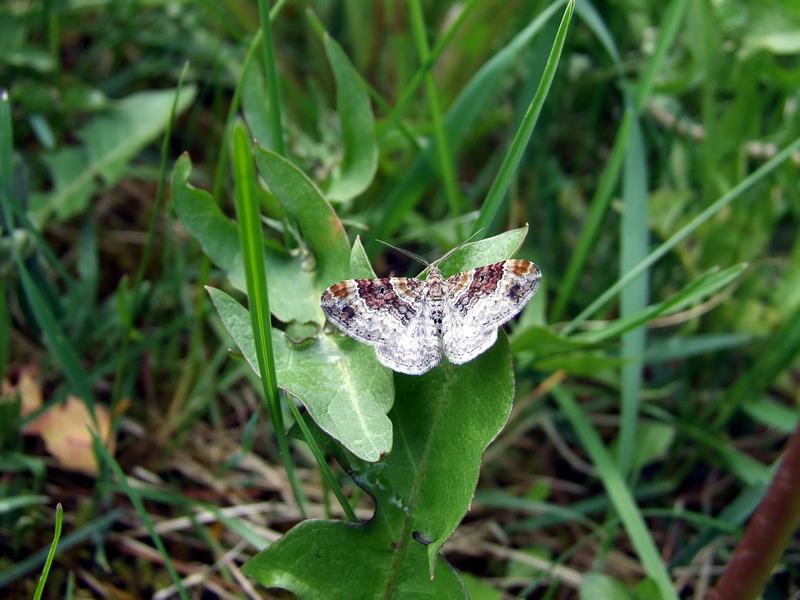

Scientific classification
- Domain: Eukaryota
- Kingdom: Animalia
- Phylum: Arthropoda
- Class: Insecta
- Order: Lepidoptera
- Family: Geometridae
- Genus: Xanthorhoe
- Species: X. decoloraria

Binomial name
- Xanthorhoe decoloraria (Esper, 1806)

Synonyms
- Phalaena decoloraria Esper, 1805; Geometra munitata Hübner, 1809; Xanthorhoe munitata (Hübner, 1809); Xanthorhoe fulvata (Fabricius, 1787) (preocc. Forster, 1771); Xanthorhoe munitaria (Boisduval, 1840); Xanthorhoe strigata (Packard, 1867); Xanthorhoe immediata (Grote, 1882); Xanthorhoe anticostiata (Strecker, 1899)

= Xanthorhoe decoloraria =

Red carpet

Species of moth

Xanthorhoe decoloraria, the red carpet, is a moth of the family Geometridae. The species was first described by Eugenius Johann Christoph Esper in 1806 and it is found in northern Europe, to the east across the Palearctic to Siberia and the north of North America; further south (as from Switzerland to Austro-Hungary) it seems to occur chiefly, if not exclusively, in the mountains.

== Description ==
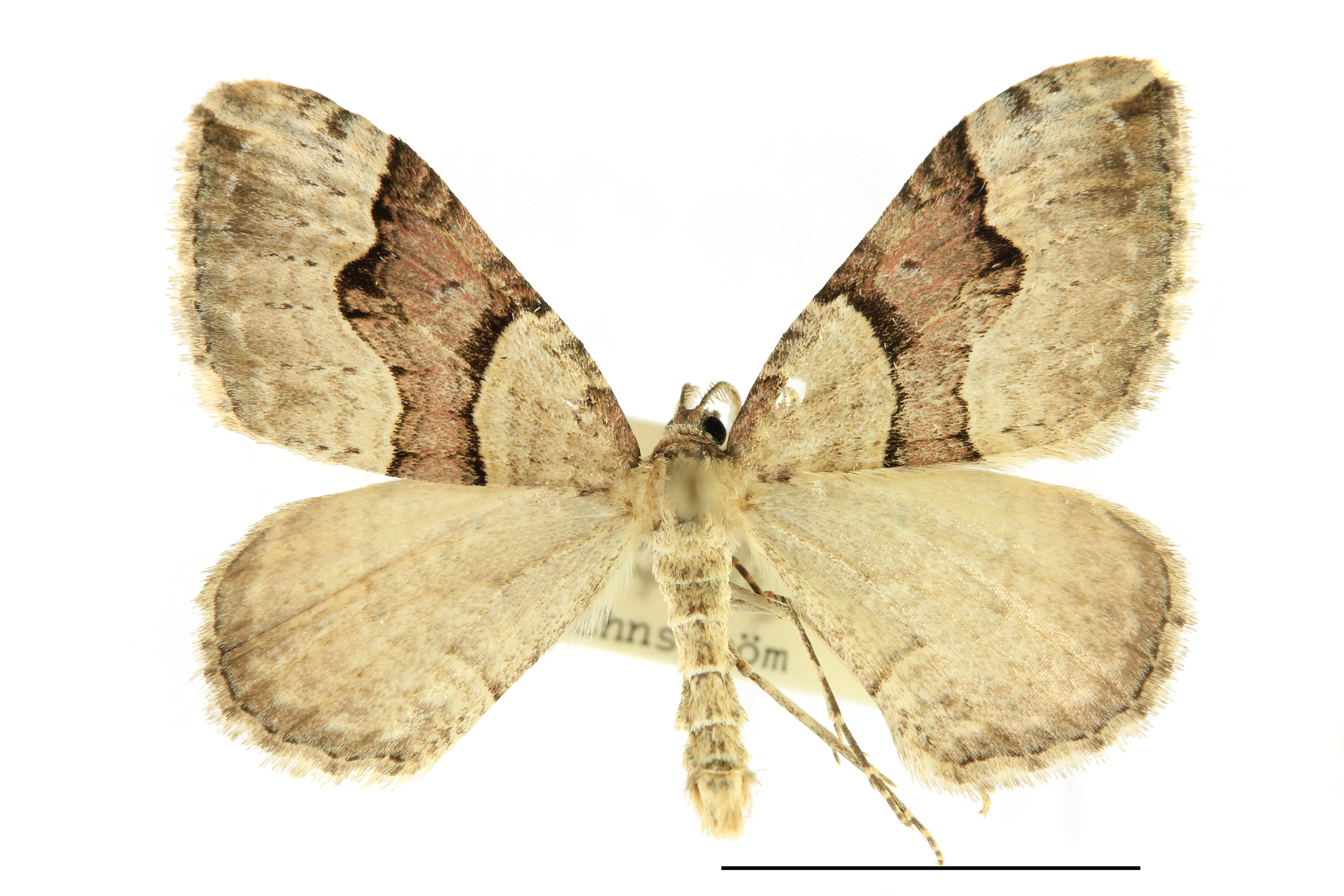

The wingspan is 19 – 26 mm. The forewings are pale greyish ochreous, with brown striae. The basal patch is fuscous-reddish, its edge curved. The median band is dull reddish, dark-striated, the edges suffused with dark ochreous-brown, the anterior curved, the posterior rounded and prominent in the middle. There is a dark ochreous-brown apical streak and the termen is suffused with grey. Hindwings are pale greyish-ochreous, with grey striae, and the termen is grey. The larva is variable, dull green or brown, black-dotted with pinkish incisions and two conspicuous blotches on segments 6 and 7, the latter large. Prout gives an account of the many variations.

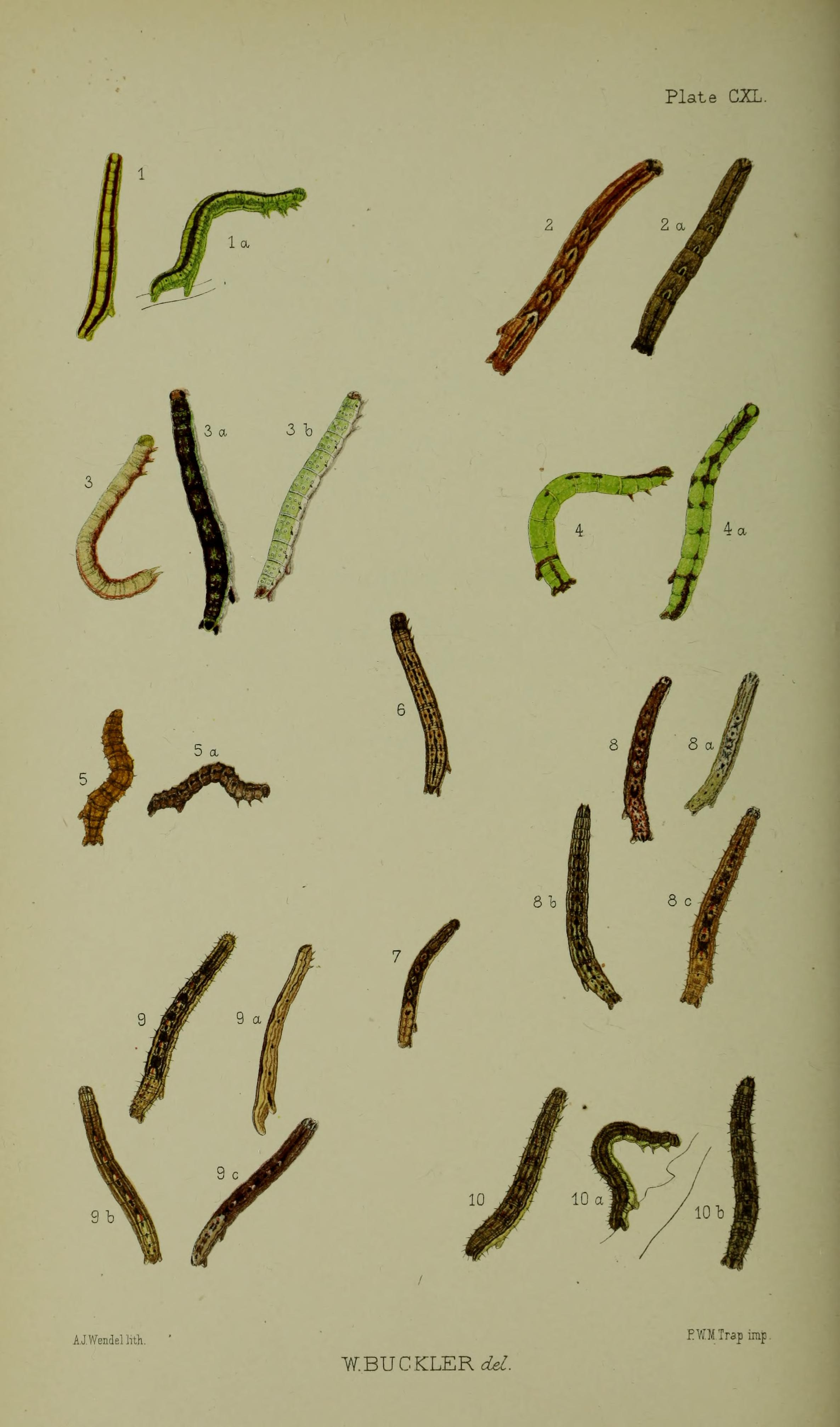
Fig 7 larvae after final moult

== Biology ==
Adults are on wing from mid-June to August.

The larvae feed on Alchemilla species and possibly other low plants.

== Subspecies ==
- Xanthorhoe decoloraria decoloraria
- Xanthorhoe decoloraria hethlandica (Shetland Isles)

== Similar species ==
Some forms closely resemble the also variable congener Xanthorhoe designata
