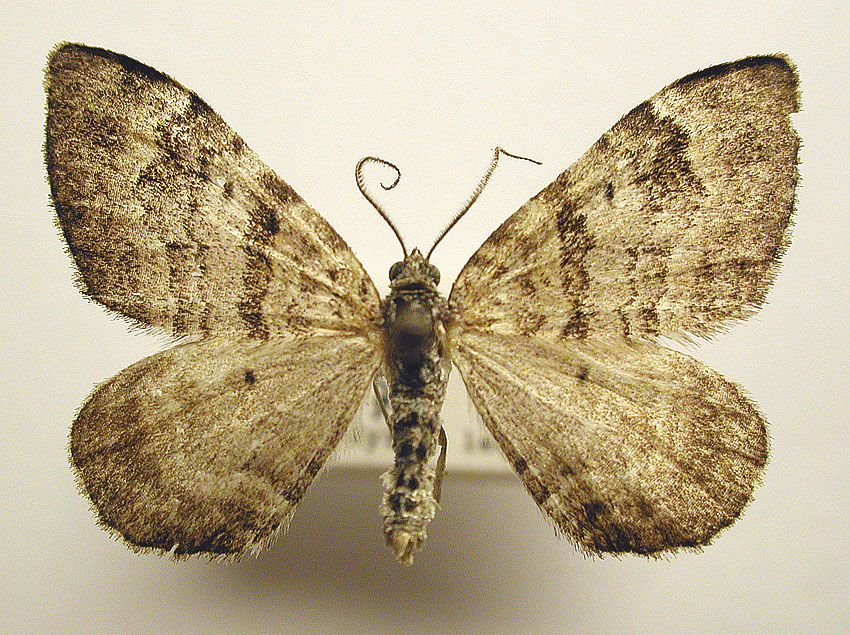

Scientific classification
- Domain: Eukaryota
- Kingdom: Animalia
- Phylum: Arthropoda
- Class: Insecta
- Order: Lepidoptera
- Family: Geometridae
- Genus: Xanthorhoe
- Species: X. abrasaria

Binomial name
- Xanthorhoe abrasaria (Herrich-Schäffer, 1856)

Synonyms
- Larentia abrasaria Herrich-Schaffer, 1855

= Xanthorhoe abrasaria =

Species of moth

Xanthorhoe abrasaria is a moth of the family Geometridae first described by Gottlieb August Wilhelm Herrich-Schäffer in 1856. It is found in the northern part of the Palearctic realm and the Nearctic realm.

The wingspan is 21–24 mm. Adults are on wing in July. There is one generation per year.

The larvae have been recorded feeding on Galium species.

== Subspecies ==
- Xanthorhoe abrasaria abrasaria (Europe)
- Xanthorhoe abrasaria congregata (Walker, 1862) (North America)
- Xanthorhoe abrasaria trilineata (Warren, 1904) (North America)
- Xanthorhoe abrasaria aquilonaria Cassino & Swett, 1922 (North America)
