= Xanthorhoe columelloides =

Scientific classification
- Domain: Eukaryota
- Kingdom: Animalia
- Phylum: Arthropoda
- Class: Insecta
- Order: Lepidoptera
- Family: Geometridae
- Genus: Xanthorhoe
- Species: X. columelloides

Binomial name
- Xanthorhoe columelloides Barnes & McDunnough, 1913

Species of moth

Xanthorhoe columelloides is a species of moth in the family Geometridae first described by William Barnes and James Halliday McDunnough in 1913. It is found in North America.

The MONA or Hodges number for Xanthorhoe columelloides is 7393.
