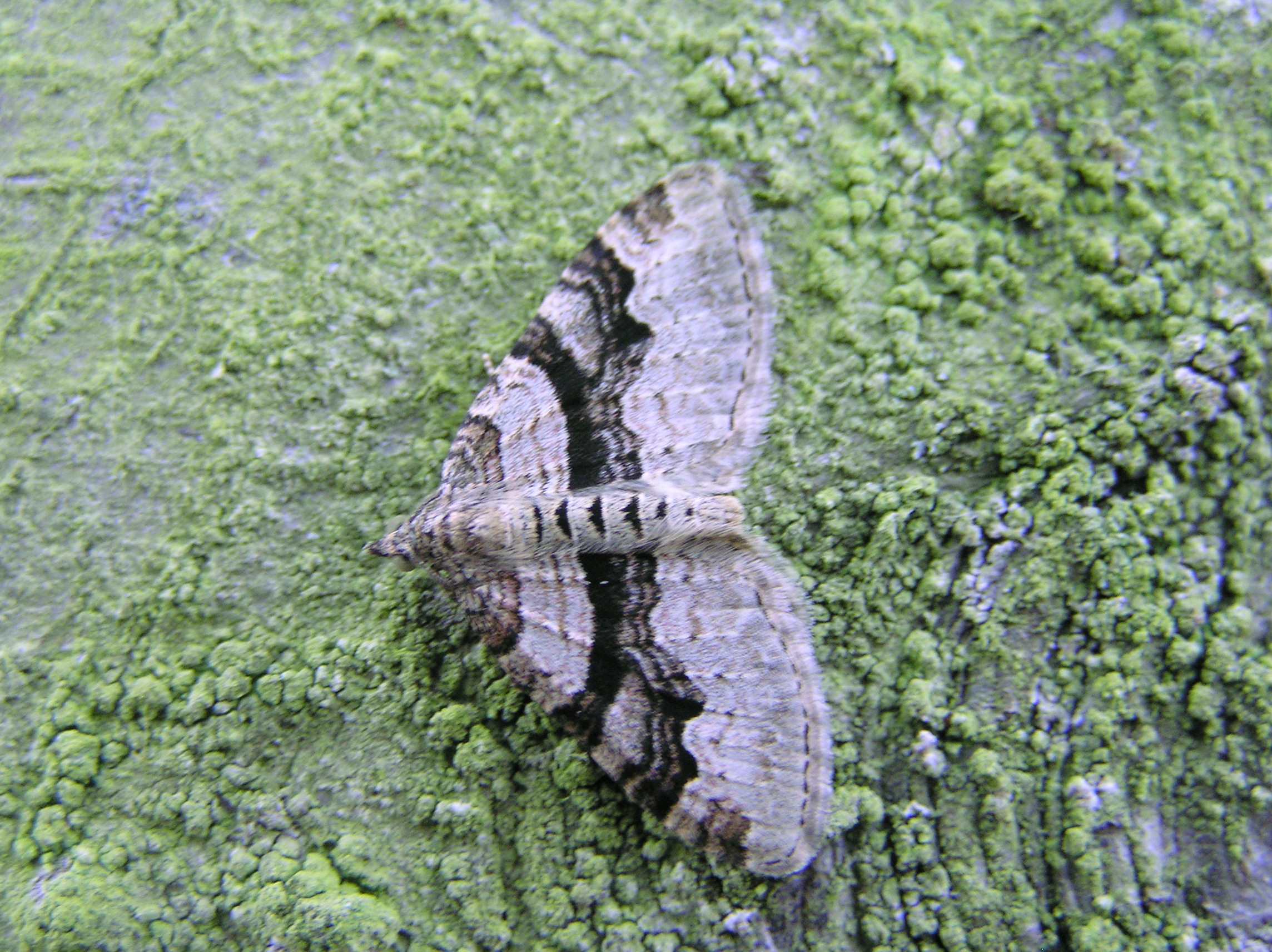

Scientific classification
- Domain: Eukaryota
- Kingdom: Animalia
- Phylum: Arthropoda
- Class: Insecta
- Order: Lepidoptera
- Family: Geometridae
- Genus: Xanthorhoe
- Species: X. designata

Binomial name
- Xanthorhoe designata (Hufnagel, 1767)

= Xanthorhoe designata =

Flame carpet

Species of moth

Xanthorhoe designata, the flame carpet, is a moth of the genus Xanthorhoe in the family Geometridae. The species was first described by Johann Siegfried Hufnagel in 1767.

== Distribution ==
It is found in Europe, Asiatic Russia and Japan.

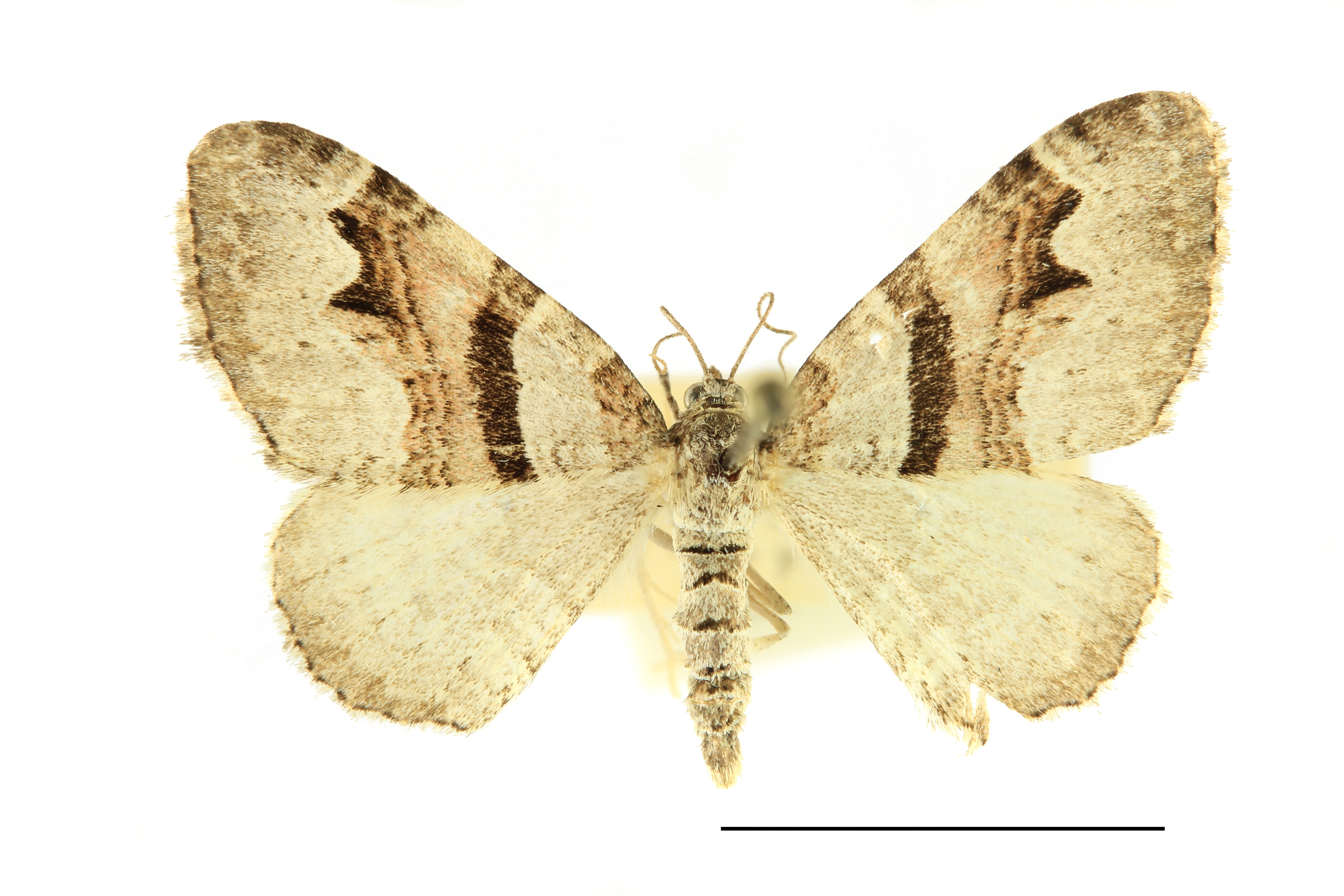

== Description ==
"Coloured nearly as in munitata but the median band is light red and with a conspicuous black bar at its proximal edge and usually with the distal edge also — at least in its anterior part, conspicuously black. Under surface more weakly marked. - ab. coarctata ab. nov. [Prout] has the median band greatly narrowed, usually very dark, about as in the corresponding aberration of ferrugata. - islandicaria Stgr. has the ground-colour more weakly marked, often whiter, the median band also pale in its centre but commonly with the black edgings widened. Iceland." The larva is relatively powerful, naked except for a few short bristles and brownish with a bright lateral stripe.

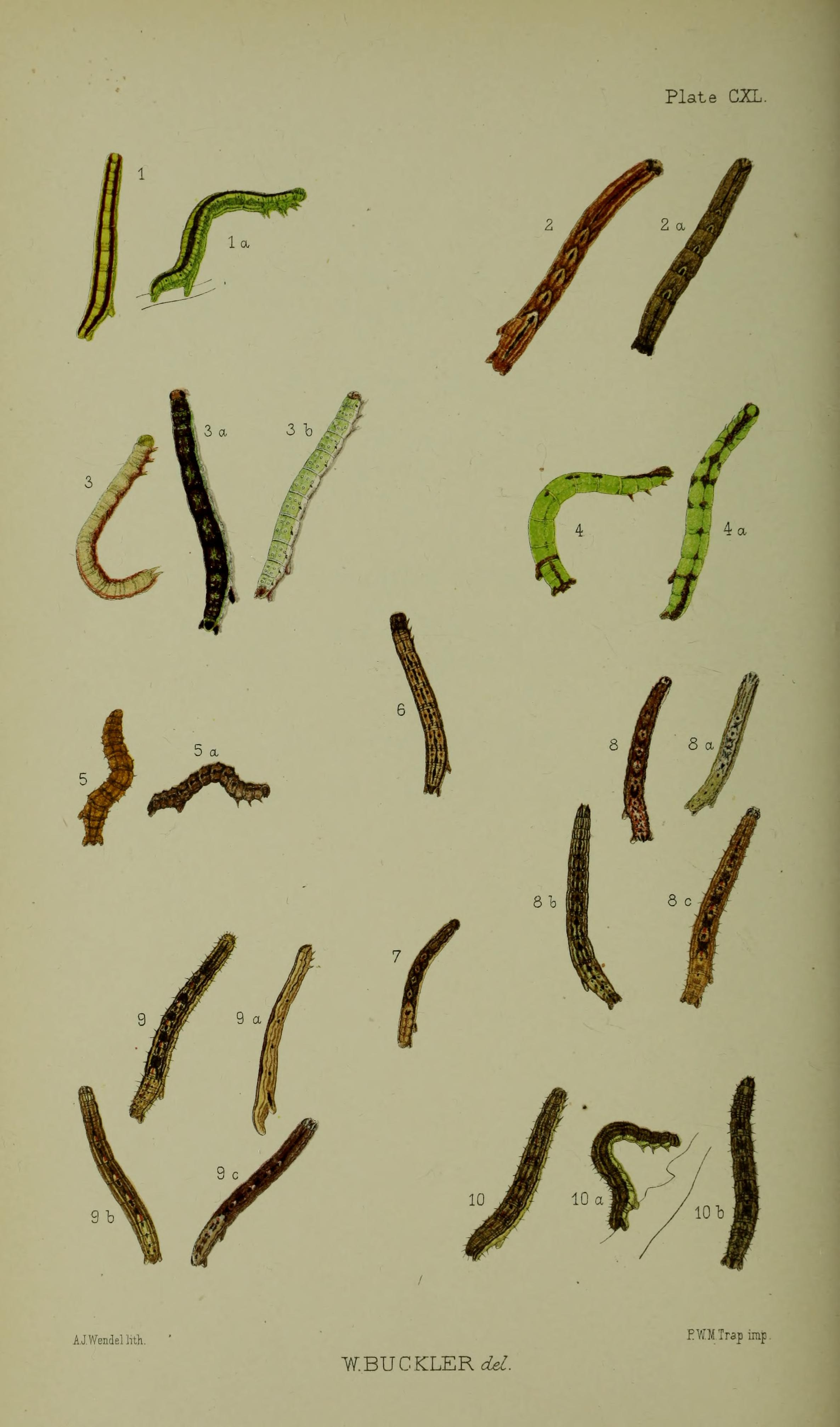
Fig 7 larvae after final moult

== Biology ==
The moth flies from the beginning of April to the end of September.

It is found in meadows, damp woodland, hedgerows and suburban gardens.

The larvae feed on species of Brassicaceae. Xanthorhoe designata overwinters as a pupa.
