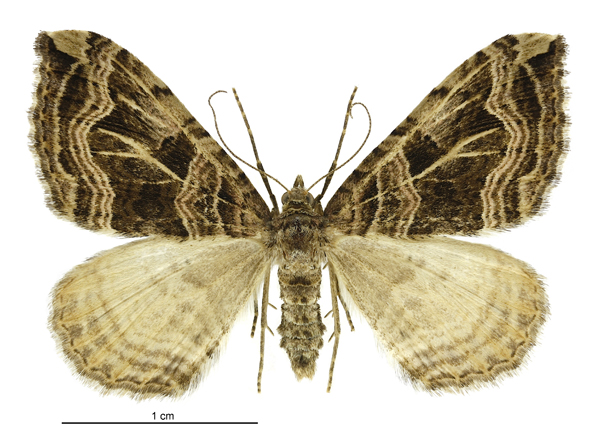
- Female
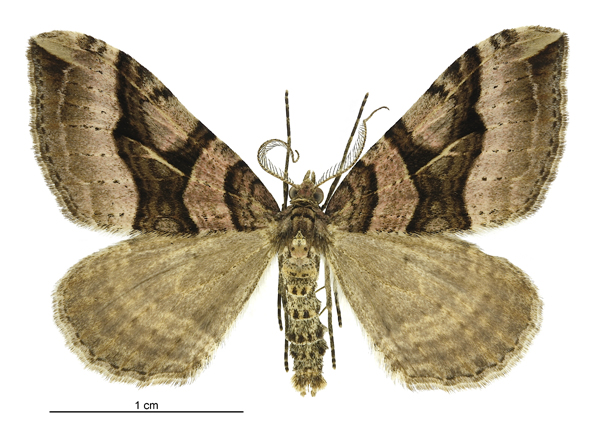
- Male

Scientific classification
- Kingdom: Animalia
- Phylum: Arthropoda
- Clade: Pancrustacea
- Class: Insecta
- Order: Lepidoptera
- Family: Geometridae
- Genus: Xanthorhoe
- Species: X. semifissata

Binomial name
- Xanthorhoe semifissata (Walker, 1862)

Synonyms
- Cohemia semifissata Walker, 1862; Larentia semifissata (Walker, 1862); Helastia semifissata (Walker, 1862); Coremia ypsilonaria Guenée, 1868; Xanthorhoe delicatulata Guenée, 1868

= Xanthorhoe semifissata =

Species of moth

Xanthorhoe semifissata, commonly known as the barred pink looper, is a moth in the family Geometridae. It is endemic to New Zealand and is found throughout the country although it is much less common in the mountains in the south and west of the South Island. The larval host plants include Nasturtium officinale as well as species in the genus Cardamine. Adult moths inhabit shrubs at the edge of native forest.

== Taxonomy ==
This species was first described by Francis Walker in 1862 using specimens collected in Nelson by T. R. Oxley and named Cohemia semifissata. In 1939 Louis Beethoven Prout placed this species in the genus Larentia. In 1971 J. S. Dugdale placed this species in the genus Helastia. The genus Helastia was restricted by Craw in 1987 placing this species into the genus Xanthorhoe. This placement was accepted in 1988 by Dugdale. The lectotype specimen is held at the Natural History Museum, London.

== Description ==
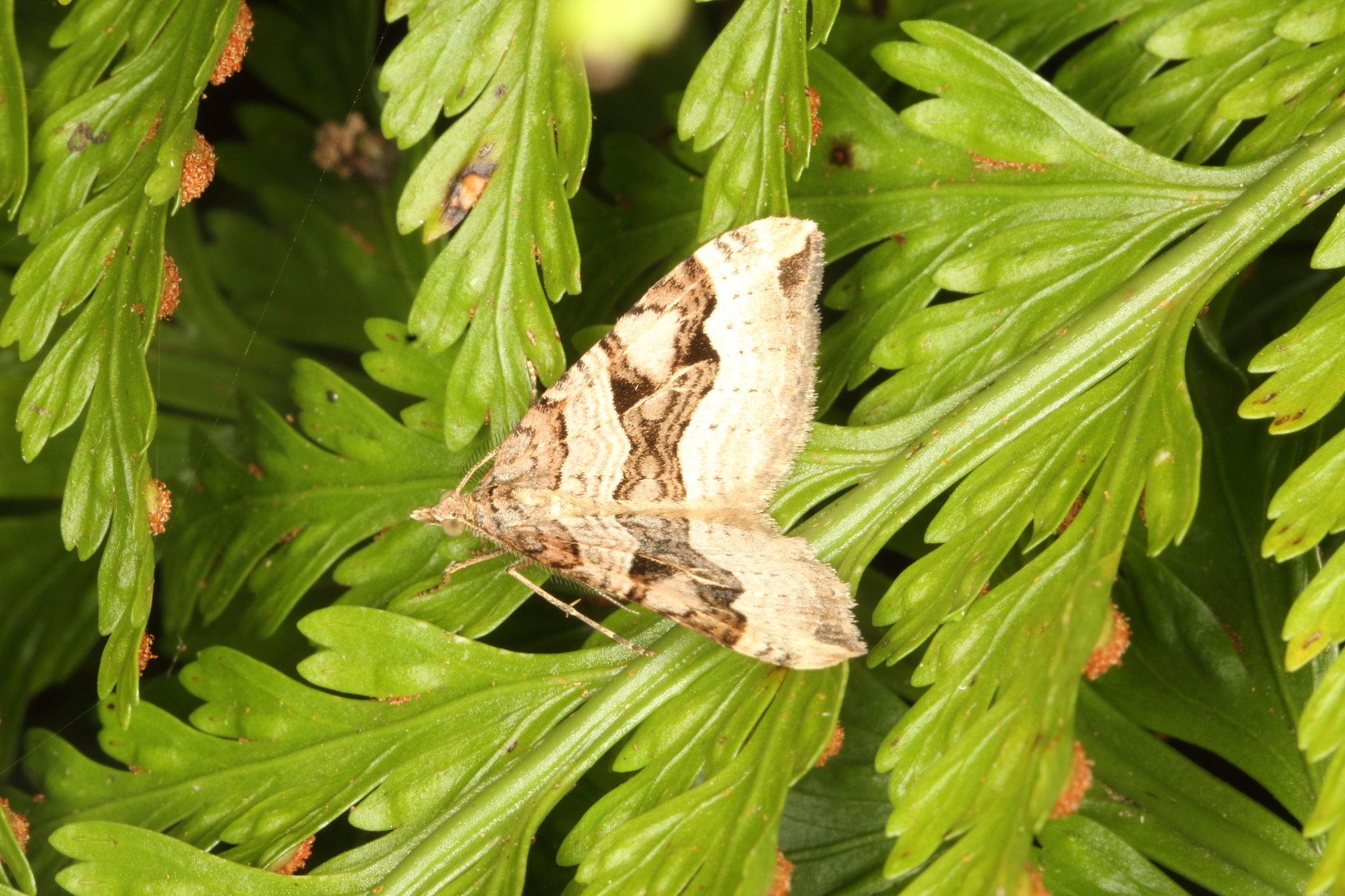
At rest.

George Hudson described this species in 1898 as follows:

The expansion of the wings is about an inch. The fore-wings of the male are pale pink; there are several wavy brown lines near the base, a very distinct brown central band, narrowest near the middle, but much broader on the costa than on the dorsum; the centre of this band is paler towards the costa; the termen is shaded with brown, except near the apex of the wing; the veins are dotted in black. The hind-wings are bright ochreous with numerous wavy darker lines. The female is darker in colour than the male, the central band is broader; there are numerous brown and pink wavy lines on each side of the central band, and the principal veins are marked in pale ochreous. The grey transverse lines on the hind-wings are much more distinct in the female than in the male.

== Distribution and habitat ==
This species is found in the North and South Islands of New Zealand as well as on Stewart Island. However this species is not common in the south and west mountains of the South Island. X. semifissata has been collected in Riccarton Bush, Christchurch.

The preferred habitat of this species is edge of forests as well as montaine grasslands. The hosts for the larvae of this moth are herbaceous plants. Gaskin noted eggs are laid on watercress (Nasturtium officinale). White listed Cardamine and stream Nasturtium as known larval foods.

== Life cycle ==
=== Eggs ===
Eggs are pale green and hemispherical in shape.

=== Larva ===
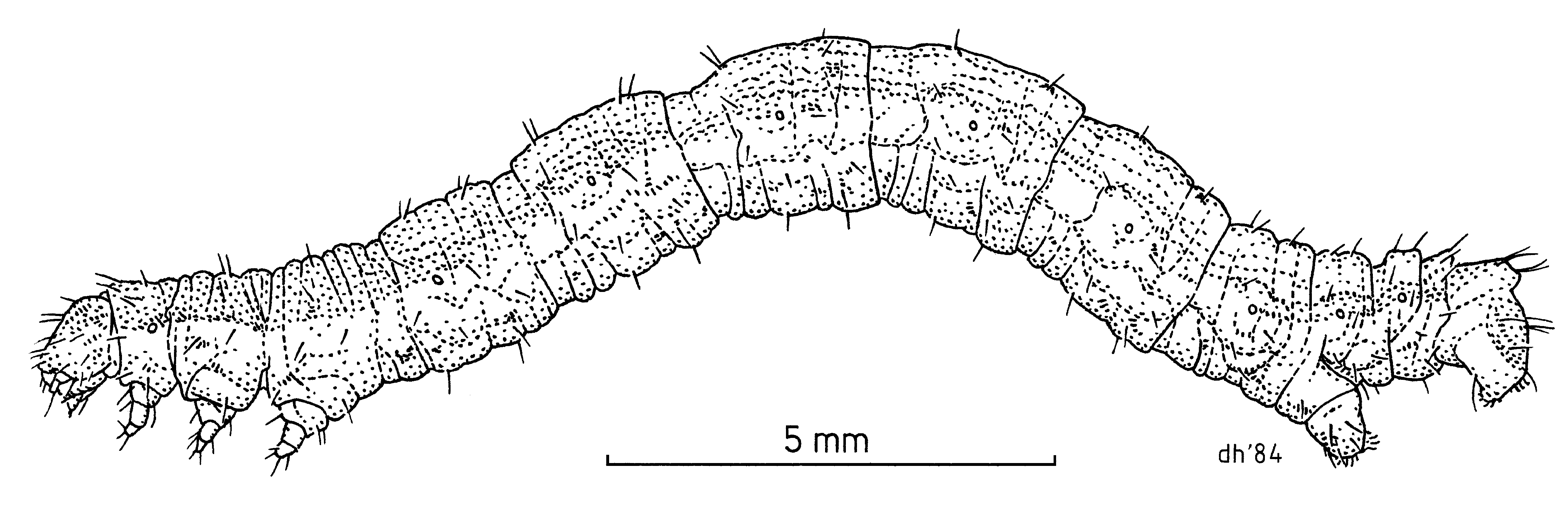
Xanthorhoe semifissata larva

The caterpillar is dark brown on its upper side and light brown below, When fully grown it is approximately 2.5 cm long.

=== Pupa ===
This species pupates in the leaf litter under the host plant.

=== Adult ===
Gaskin hypothesised that this species has two broods, the first in spring and early summer and the second in late summer. It is possible that the second may overwinter. The adults have been collected in March, May, August and October in Riccarton Bush, Christchurch. In the montane grasslands at Arthur's Pass, this moth was seen from November through to April.

== Behaviour ==
Adults are attracted to light and have been collected via a mercury vapour light trap.
