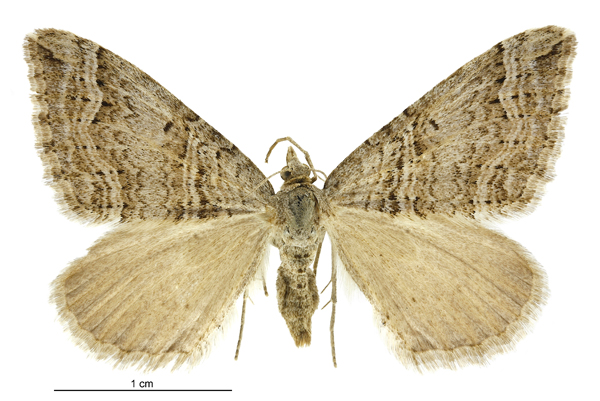
- Female
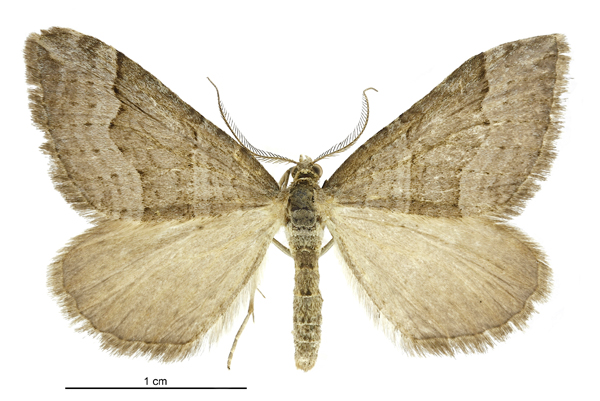
- Male

Scientific classification
- Kingdom: Animalia
- Phylum: Arthropoda
- Class: Insecta
- Order: Lepidoptera
- Family: Geometridae
- Genus: Xanthorhoe
- Species: X. orophyla

Binomial name
- Xanthorhoe orophyla (Meyrick, 1883)

Synonyms
- Epyaxa orophyla Meyrick, 1883; Epyaxa orophylla Meyrick, 1883; Xanthorhoe orophylla (Meyrick, 1883)

= Xanthorhoe orophyla =

Species of moth

Xanthorhoe orophyla is a moth of the family Geometridae. It is endemic to New Zealand and is found in the South Island in alpine habitat. This species has one brood a year and their larvae feed on cruciferous plants. Adults are on the wing from December to February and are attracted to light.

== Taxonomy ==
This species was first described by Edward Meyrick in 1883 under the name Epyaxa orophylla in a published abstract. Meyrick gave a fuller description of the species in 1884 under the name Epyaxa orophyla. In 1898 George Hudson discussed the species under the name orophyla when placing it within the genus Xanthorhoe. Meyrick again discussed the species in 1917 under the name orophyla when agreeing with its placement in the genus Xanthorhoe. In 1928 Hudson, in his seminal work The butterflies and moths of New Zealand, discussed and illustrated this species again spelling the specific epithet orophyla. In 1988 J. S. Dugdale discussed this species under the epithet orophylla. However, in 2010 the New Zealand Inventory of Biodiversity referred to the species by the epithet orophyla and this spelling has also been followed by the New Zealand Organisms Register. The male lectotype, collected at Lake Wakatipu, is held at the Natural History Museum, London.

== Description ==
In 1898 George Hudson described the species as follows:

The expansion of the wings of the male is 1 1/4 inches, of the female 1 3/8 inches. The fore-wings of the male are pale brownish-grey; there is an obscure bent blackish line near the base, a moderately broad central band bounded by two very distinct shaded blackish lines, the basal one of which is not curved; the termen is shaded with darker grey, and there is an oblique pale mark near the apex. The hind-wings are pale grey tinged with ochreous. The female is slightly darker than the male; and there are numerous wavy pale and dark grey lines filling up the entire wing on each side of the central band.

== Distribution and habitat ==
X. orophyla can be found in the high country of the South Island and has been collected in Nelson, Canterbury, and Otago. They prefer open areas in lowland to alpine habitat.

== Behaviour and life cycle ==
This species has one brood a year. Adults are on the wing from December to February. The moths are attracted to light. This species is said to be common on Aoraki / Mount Cook's lower slopes.

== Host species ==
Larvae of this species feed on cruciferous plants.
