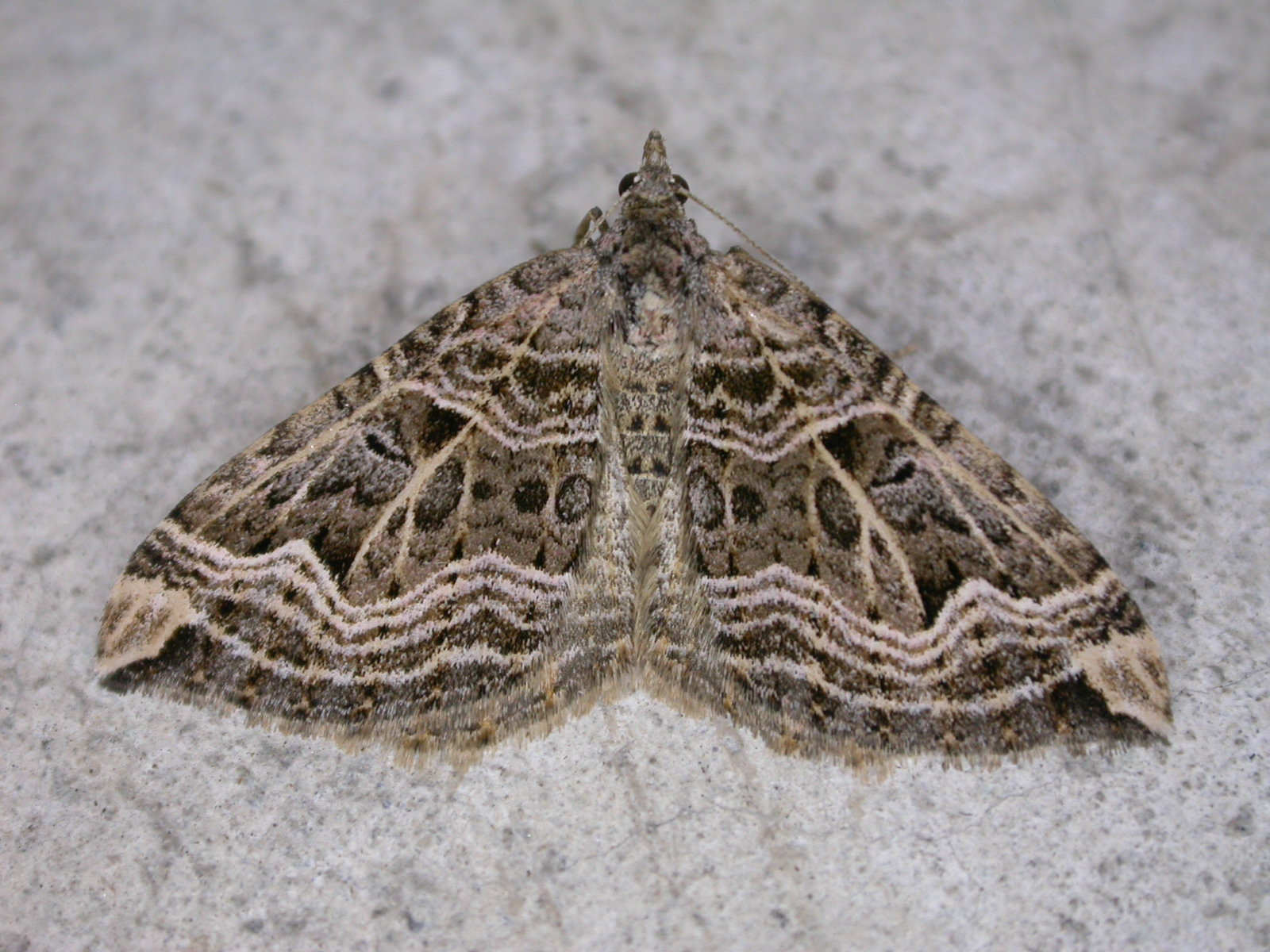
- Xanthorhoe semifissata

Scientific classification
- Kingdom: Animalia
- Phylum: Arthropoda
- Class: Insecta
- Order: Lepidoptera
- Family: Geometridae
- Tribe: Xanthorhoini
- Genus: Xanthorhoe; Hübner, [1825]

Synonyms
- Anisolasia Warren, 1904; Diploctena Turner, 1904; Malenydris Hübner, 1825; Monochyria Warren, 1901; Ochyria Hübner, 1825; Odontorhoe Aubert, 1962; Parodontorhoe Aubert, 1962; Scotocoremia Butler, 1882; Visiana C. Swinhoe, 1900

= Xanthorhoe =

Genus of moths

Xanthorhoe is a genus of moths of the family Geometridae described by Jacob Hübner in 1825.

== Selected species ==
- Xanthorhoe ablechra D. S. Fletcher, 1958
- Xanthorhoe abrasaria (Herrich-Schäffer, 1856)
- Xanthorhoe abyssinica Herbulot, 1983
- Xanthorhoe albodivisaria (Aurivillius, 1910)
- Xanthorhoe algidata (Möschler, 1874) (syn: Xanthorhoe dodata Cassino and Swett 1920)
- Xanthorhoe alluaudi (Prout, 1932)
- Xanthorhoe alta Debauche, 1937
- Xanthorhoe alticola (Aurivillius, 1925)
- Xanthorhoe alticolata Barnes & McDunnough, 1916
- Xanthorhoe altispex (L. B. Prout, 1921)
- Xanthorhoe anaspila Meyrick, 1891
- Xanthorhoe annotinata (Zetterstedt, 1839)
- Xanthorhoe ansorgei (Warren, 1899)
- Xanthorhoe argenteolineata (Aurivillius, 1910)
- Xanthorhoe baffinensis (Mcdunnough)
- Xanthorhoe barnsi (L. B. Prout, 1921)
- Xanthorhoe belgarum Herbulot, 1981
- Xanthorhoe biriviata (Borkhausen, 1794)
- Xanthorhoe borbonicata (Guenée, 1858)
- Xanthorhoe brachytoma Prout, 1933
- Xanthorhoe braunsi Janse, 1933
- Xanthorhoe bulbulata Guenée, 1868
- Xanthorhoe cadra (Debauche, 1937)
- Xanthorhoe callirrhoda D. S. Fletcher, 1958
- Xanthorhoe calycopsis Prout, 1933
- Xanthorhoe columelloides Barnes & McDunnough, 1913
- Xanthorhoe conchata Warren, 1898
- Xanthorhoe conchulata (L. B. Prout, 1921)
- Xanthorhoe consors (Prout, 1935)
- Xanthorhoe cuneosignata Debauche, 1937
- Xanthorhoe curcumata (Moore, 1888)
- Xanthorhoe cybele Prout, 1931
- Xanthorhoe decoloraria (Esper, 1806)
- Xanthorhoe defensaria (Guenée in Boisduval & Guenée, 1858)
- Xanthorhoe designata (Hufnagel, 1767)
- Xanthorhoe dissociata (Walker, 1863)
- Xanthorhoe eugraphata (de Joannis, 1915)
- Xanthorhoe euthytoma Prout, 1926
- Xanthorhoe excelsissima Herbulot, 1977
- Xanthorhoe exorista Prout, 1922
- Xanthorhoe ferrugata (Clerck, 1759)
- Xanthorhoe fluctuata (Linnaeus, 1758)
- Xanthorhoe fossaria Taylor, 1906
- Xanthorhoe frigida Howes, 1946
- Xanthorhoe heliopharia (C. Swinhoe, 1904)
- Xanthorhoe heteromorpha (Hampson, 1909)
- Xanthorhoe holophaea (Hampson, 1899)
- Xanthorhoe iduata (Guenée)
- Xanthorhoe incudina Herbulot, 1981
- Xanthorhoe incursata (Hübner, 1813)
- Xanthorhoe labradorensis (Packard)
- Xanthorhoe lacustrata (Guenée)
- Xanthorhoe latigrisea (Warren, 1897)
- Xanthorhoe latissima L. B. Prout, 1921
- Xanthorhoe lophogramma Meyrick, 1897
- Xanthorhoe magnata Herbulot, 1957
- Xanthorhoe malgassa Herbulot, 1954
- Xanthorhoe macdunnoughi Swett, 1918
- Xanthorhoe mediofascia (Wileman, 1915)
- Xanthorhoe melissaria (Guenée, 1858)
- Xanthorhoe mimica Janse, 1933
- Xanthorhoe mirabilata (Grote, 1883)
- Xanthorhoe molata Felder, 1875
- Xanthorhoe montanata (Denis & Schiffermüller, 1775)
- Xanthorhoe morosa Prout, 1933
- Xanthorhoe munitata (Hübner)
- Xanthorhoe oculata D. S. Fletcher, 1958
- Xanthorhoe orophyla (Meyrick, 1883)
- Xanthorhoe orophylloides Hudson, 1909
- Xanthorhoe oxybiata Millière, 1872
- Xanthorhoe peripleta (Brandt, 1941)
- Xanthorhoe phiara (L. B. Prout, 1921)
- Xanthorhoe phyxelia Prout, 1933
- Xanthorhoe pontiaria Taylor, 1906
- Xanthorhoe poseata (Geyer, 1837)
- Xanthorhoe procne (Fawcett, 1916)
- Xanthorhoe pseudognathus Herbulot, 1981
- Xanthorhoe quadrifasciata (Clerck, 1759)
- Xanthorhoe ramaria (Swett and Casino)
- Xanthorhoe rhodoides (Brandt, 1941)
- Xanthorhoe ruandana (Debauche, 1938)
- Xanthorhoe rudnicki Karisch & Hoppe, 2011
- Xanthorhoe rufivenata D. S. Fletcher, 1958
- Xanthorhoe saturata (Guenée, 1857)
- Xanthorhoe scarificata Prout, 1932
- Xanthorhoe semifissata Walker, 1862
- Xanthorhoe spadicearia (Denis & Schiffermüller, 1775)
- Xanthorhoe spatuluncis Wiltshire, 1982
- Xanthorhoe sublesta (Prout, 1932)
- Xanthorhoe submaculata (Warren, 1902)
- Xanthorhoe taiwana (Wileman, 1914)
- Xanthorhoe tamsi D. S. Fletcher, 1963
- Xanthorhoe transcissa (Warren, 1902)
- Xanthorhoe transjugata Prout, 1923
- Xanthorhoe trientata (Warren, 1901)
- Xanthorhoe tuta Herbulot, 1981
- Xanthorhoe vacillans Herbulot, 1954
- Xanthorhoe vana (Prout, 1926)
- Xanthorhoe vidanoi Parenzan & Hausmann, 1994
- Xanthorhoe wellsi (Prout, 1928)
- Xanthorhoe wiltshirei (Brandt, 1941)
