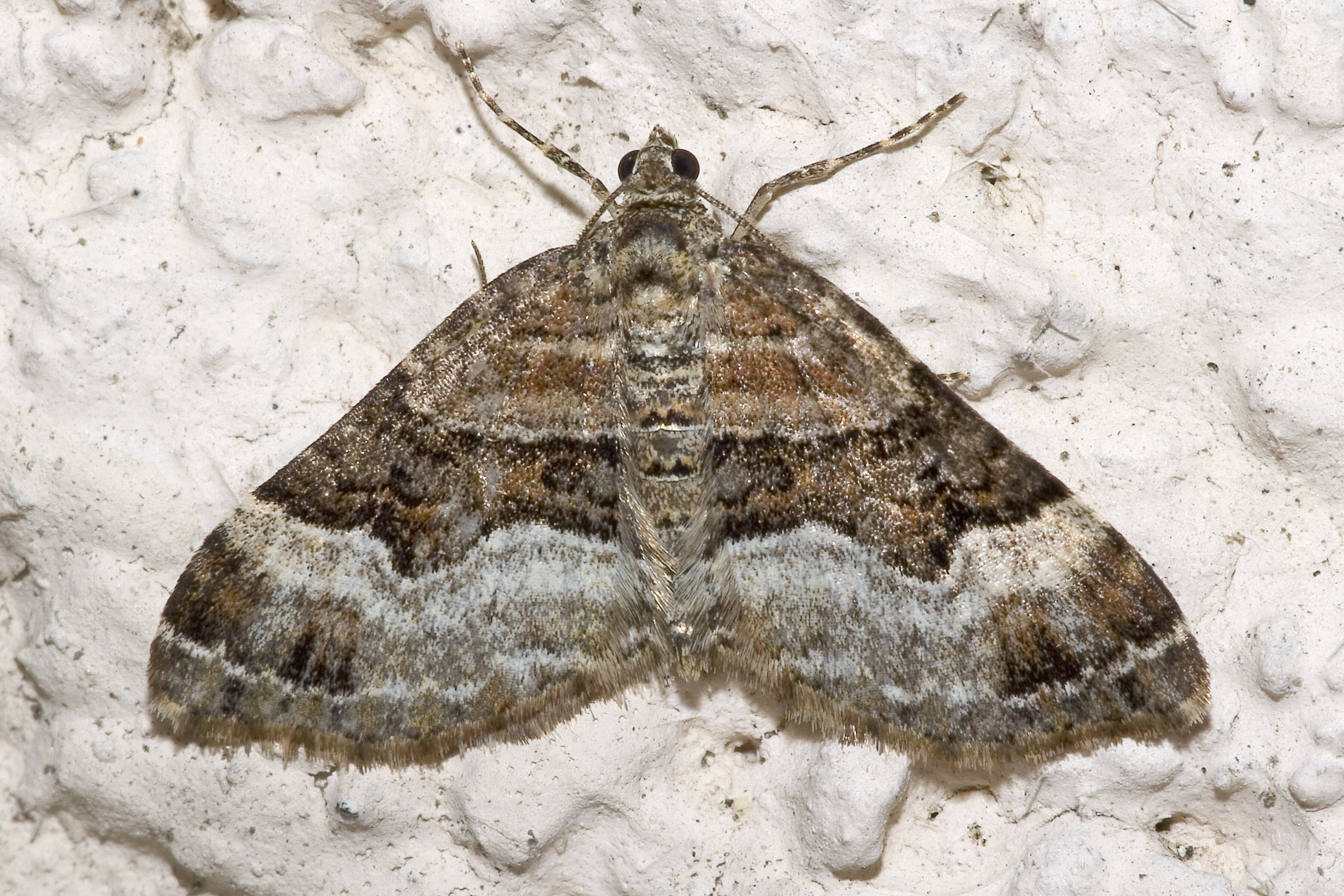

Scientific classification
- Domain: Eukaryota
- Kingdom: Animalia
- Phylum: Arthropoda
- Class: Insecta
- Order: Lepidoptera
- Family: Geometridae
- Genus: Xanthorhoe
- Species: X. biriviata

Binomial name
- Xanthorhoe biriviata (Borkhausen, 1794)

= Xanthorhoe biriviata =

Balsam carpet

Species of moth

Xanthorhoe biriviata, the balsam carpet, is a moth of the genus Xanthorhoe in the family Geometridae. The species was first described by Moritz Balthasar Borkhausen in 1794. It is found "widespread in Europe and temperate Asia. In southern Europe the distribution is restricted only locally to the mountain(s)."

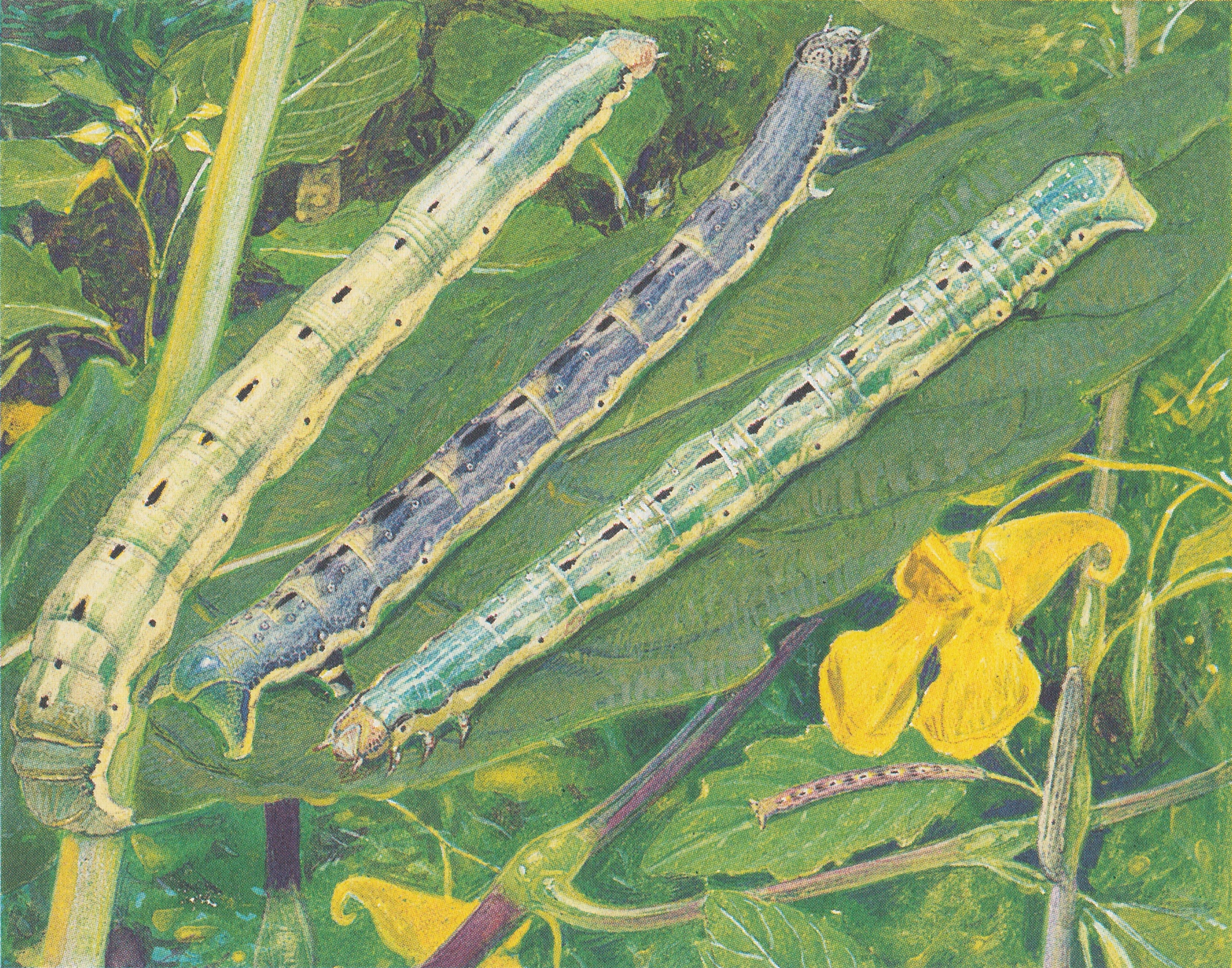
Caterpillars in three different colour variants
