= List of Lepidoptera of Greenland =

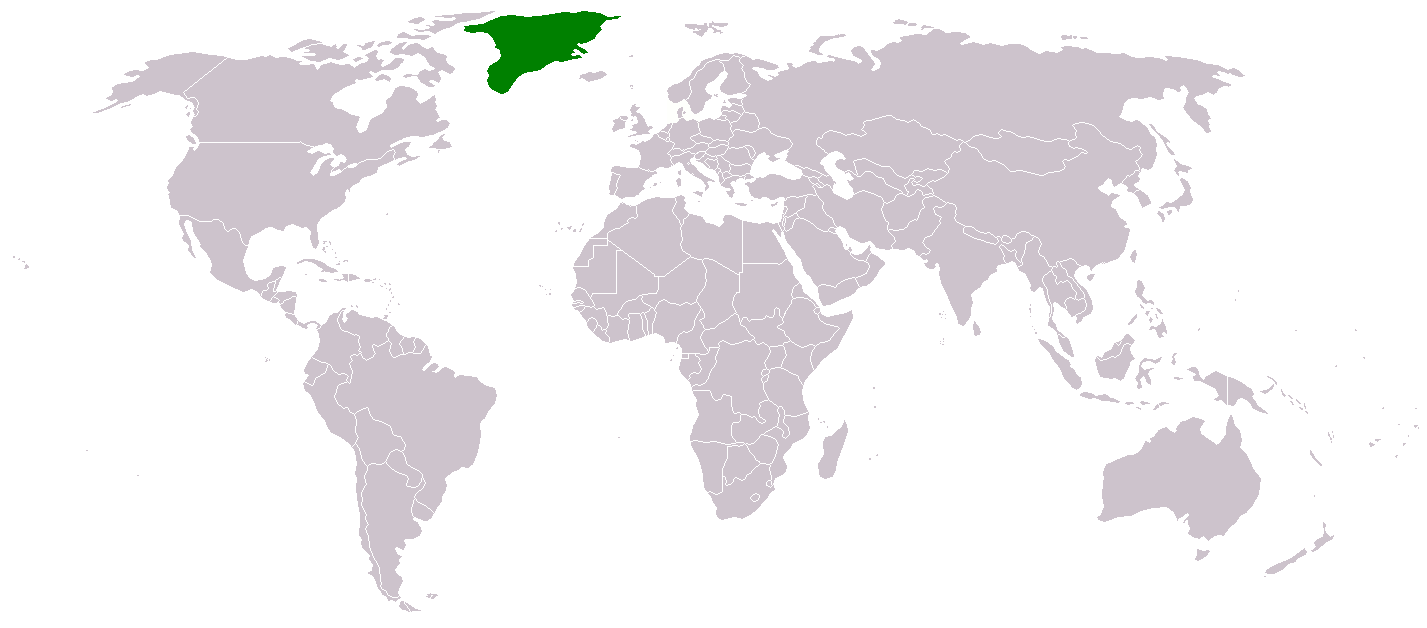
Location of Greenland

Lepidoptera of Greenland consist of both the butterflies and moths recorded from Greenland.

According to a recent estimate, there are a total of 52 Lepidoptera species present in Greenland.

== Butterflies ==
=== Lycaenidae ===
- Lycaena phlaeas feildeni (McLachlan, 1878)
- Agriades glandon aquilina (Staudinger, 1901)

=== Nymphalidae ===
- Boloria polaris (Boisduval, [1828])
- Boloria chariclea (Schneider, 1794)

=== Pieridae ===
- Colias hecla Lefèbvre, 1836

== Moths ==
=== Arctiidae ===
- Pararctia lapponica hyperborea (Curtis, 1835)

=== Coleophoridae ===
- Coleophora alticolella Zeller, 1849
- Coleophora glaucicolella Wood, 1892

=== Crambidae ===
- Gesneria centuriella (Denis & Schiffermüller, 1775)
- Udea torvalis (Möschler, 1864)
- Tehama bonifatella (Hulst, 1887)

=== Gelechiidae ===
- Bryotropha similis (Stainton, 1854)
- Gnorimoschema valesiella (Staudinger, 1877)
- Gnorimoschema vibei Wolff, 1964
- Phthorimaea operculella (Zeller, 1873)

=== Geometridae ===
- Entephria polata (Duponchel, 1831)
- Eupithecia gelidata Möschler, 1860
- Eupithecia pusillata Denis & Schiffermüller, 1775
- Operophtera bruceata (Hulst, 1886)
- Psychophora sabini (Kirby, 1824)

=== Gracillariidae ===
- ?Phyllonorycter junoniella (Zeller, 1846)

=== Lymantriidae ===
- Gynaephora groenlandica (Wocke, 1874)

=== Noctuidae ===
- Apamea zeta (Treitschke, 1825)
- Autographa gamma (Linnaeus, 1758)
- Eurois occulta (Linnaeus, 1758)
- Euxoa adumbrata drewseni (Staudinger, 1857)
- Euxoa westermanni (Staudinger, 1857)
- Lasionycta leucocycla (Staudinger, 1857)
- Mniotype adusta (Esper, 1790)
- Mniotype sommeri (Lefebvre, 1836)
- Polia richardsoni (Curtis, 1835)
- Rhyacia quadrangula (Zetterstedt, 1839)
- Spaelotis clandestina (Harris, 1841)
- Sympistis lapponica (Thunberg, 1791)
- Sympistis nigrita Staudinger, 1857
- Syngrapha borea (Aurivillius, 1890)
- Syngrapha parilis (Hübner, 1809)
- Syngrapha u-aureum (Guenée, 1852)

=== Oecophoridae ===
- Agonopterix antennariella Clarke, 1941
- Agonopterix heracliana (Linnaeus, 1758)
- Hofmannophila pseudospretella (Stainton, 1849)

=== Plutellidae ===
- Plutella xylostella (Linnaeus, 1758)
- Rhigognostis senilella (Zetterstedt, 1839)

=== Pterophoridae ===
- Stenoptilia mengeli Fernald, 1898

=== Pyralidae ===
- Plodia interpunctella (Hübner, [1813])
- Pyla fusca (Haworth, 1811)

=== Scythrididae ===
- Scythris noricella (Zeller, 1843)

=== Tortricidae ===
- Acleris arcticana (Guenée, 1845)
- Acleris laterana (Fabricius, 1794)
- Epinotia trigonella (Linnaeus, 1758)
- Olethreutes mengelana (Fernald, 1894)
- Olethreutes inquietana (Walker, 1863)
