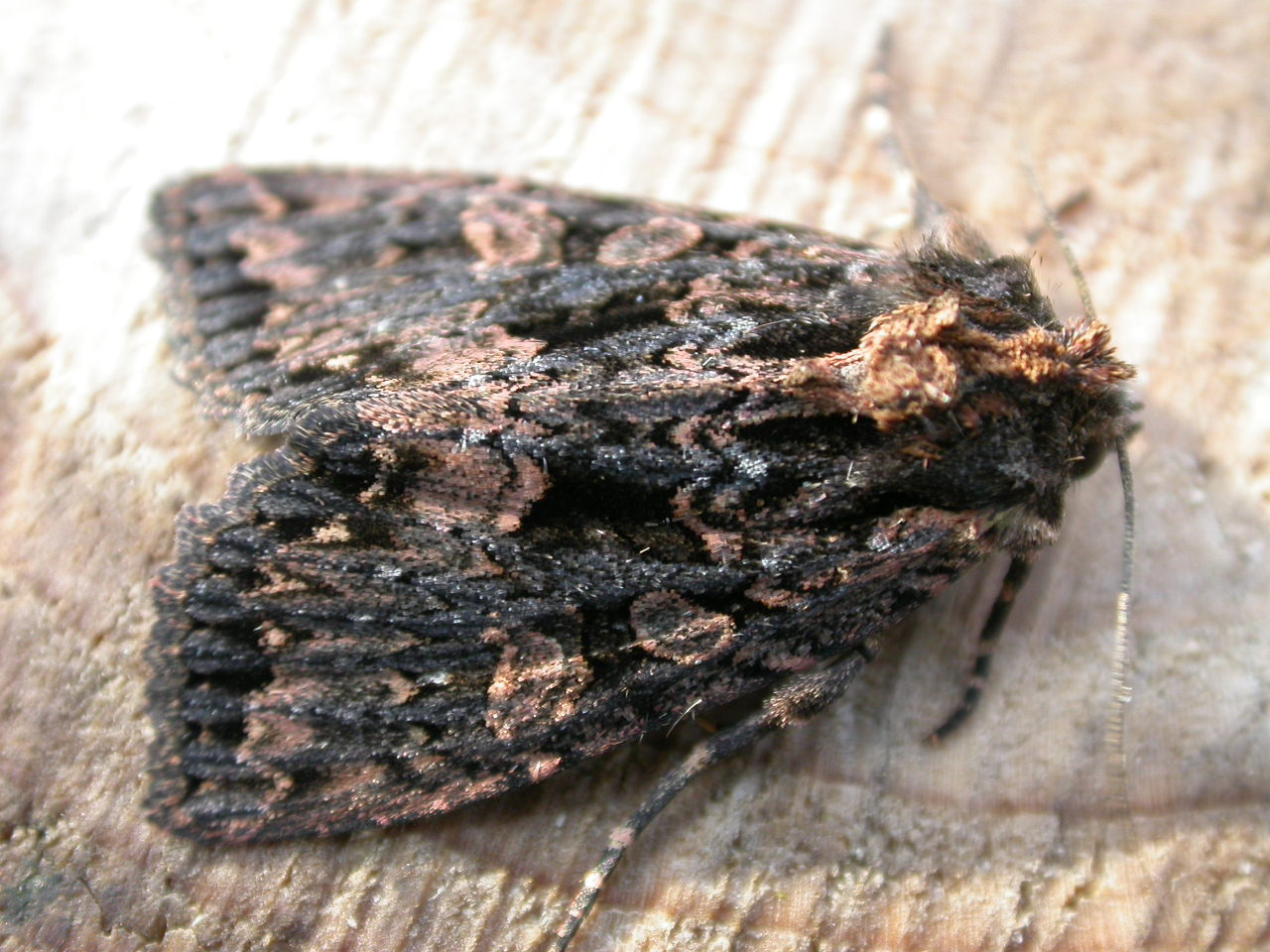
- Mniotype satura

Scientific classification
- Domain: Eukaryota
- Kingdom: Animalia
- Phylum: Arthropoda
- Class: Insecta
- Order: Lepidoptera
- Superfamily: Noctuoidea
- Family: Noctuidae
- Subtribe: Antitypina
- Genus: Mniotype; Franclemont, 1941

Synonyms
- Blepharamia Berio, 1980; Pseudomniotype Beck, 1991

= Mniotype =

Genus of moths

Mniotype is a genus of moths of the family Noctuidae.

== Species ==
- Mniotype adusta – Dark Brocade (Esper, 1790) (syn: Mniotype sommeri (Lefebvre, 1836))
- Mniotype albostigmata (Bethune-Baker, 1891)
- Mniotype anilis (Boisduval, 1840)
- Mniotype aphanes (Boursin, 1980)
- Mniotype aulombardi Plante, 1994
- Mniotype bathensis (Lutzau, 1905)
- Mniotype cbgurungi Hreblay & Ronkay, 1998
- Mniotype chlorobesa Hreblay, Peregovits & Ronkay, 1999
- Mniotype clavata Hreblay & Ronkay, 1999
- Mniotype compitalis (Draudt, 1909)
- Mniotype concinna (Leech, 1900)
- Mniotype csanadii Hreblay & Ronkay, 1999
- Mniotype cyanochlora Hreblay & Ronkay, 1998
- Mniotype deluccai (Berio, 1976)
- Mniotype ducta (Grote, 1878) (syn: Mniotype versuta (Smith, 1895))
- Mniotype falcifera Hreblay & Ronkay, 1999
- Mniotype fratellum (Pinker, 1965)
- Mniotype hackeri de Freina & Behounek, 1996
- Mniotype inthanoni Hreblay & Ronkay, 1999
- Mniotype johanna (Staudinger, 1897)
- Mniotype krisztina Hreblay & Ronkay, 1998
- Mniotype lama (Staudinger, 1900)
- Mniotype leucocyma (Hampson, 1907)
- Mniotype lugens Ronkay & Varga, 1990
- Mniotype melanodonta (Hampson, 1906)
- Mniotype mucronata (Moore, 1882)
- Mniotype olivascens (Draudt, 1950)
- Mniotype pallescens McDunnough, 1946
- Mniotype satura – Beautiful Arches (Denis & Schiffermüller, 1775)
- Mniotype schumacheri (Rebel, 1917)
- Mniotype solieri (Boisduval, 1829)
- Mniotype spinosa (Chrétien, 1911)
- Mniotype tenera (Smith, 1900) (syn: Mniotype ferida (Smith, 1908), Mniotype miniota (Smith, 1908))
- Mniotype usurpatrix (Rebel, 1914)
