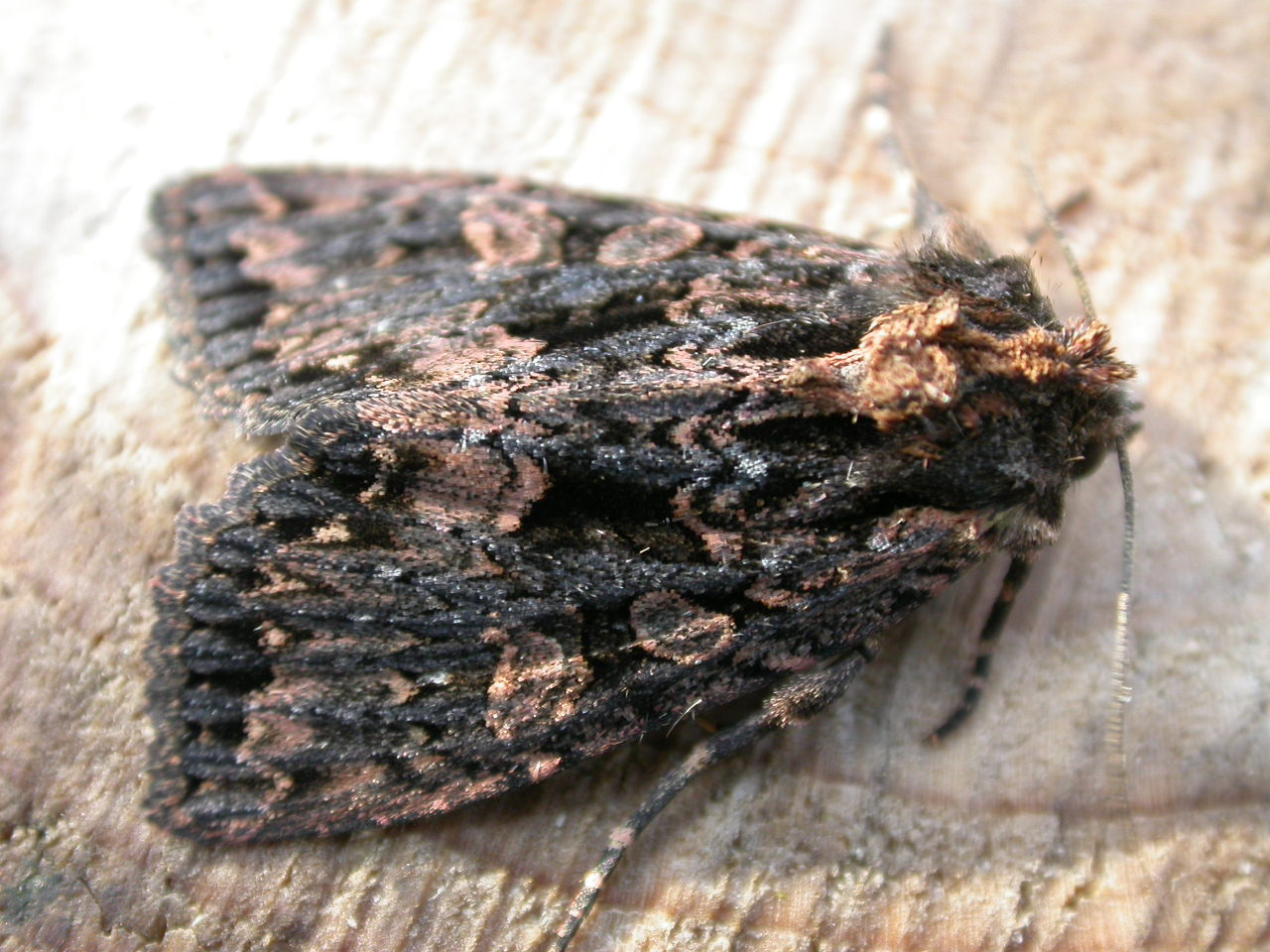

Scientific classification
- Domain: Eukaryota
- Kingdom: Animalia
- Phylum: Arthropoda
- Class: Insecta
- Order: Lepidoptera
- Superfamily: Noctuoidea
- Family: Noctuidae
- Genus: Mniotype
- Species: M. satura

Binomial name
- Mniotype satura (Denis & Schiffermüller, 1775)

Synonyms
- Blepharita satura; Ablephica satura

= Mniotype satura =

Species of moth

Mniotype satura, the beautiful arches, is a moth of the family Noctuidae. It is found in the Palearctic realm.

== Technical description and variation ==
C. satura Schiff. (= porphyrea Esp.) (32 b). Shorter- and broader-winged than melanodonta [Mniotype melanodonta (Hampson, 1906)] . Forewing dull reddish throughout, more or less hidden by the purplish black suffusion; the upper stigmata, the basal patch, the submarginal area, and the subterminal line all dull reddish; the wedge-shaped marks before the last much shorter and less conspicuous; otherwise as in melanodonta; hindwing dark brownish-fuscous, with cellspot and slight outer line marked; a pale terminal streak at anal angle. Larva reddish brown, darker along dorsum; dorsal line interrupted and obscure; spiracular yellowish green; an obscure subdorsal row of oblique grey streaks. The wingspan is 40–50 mm.

== Biology ==
The moth flies from July to October depending on the location.

The larvae feed on various woody plants and deciduous trees.
