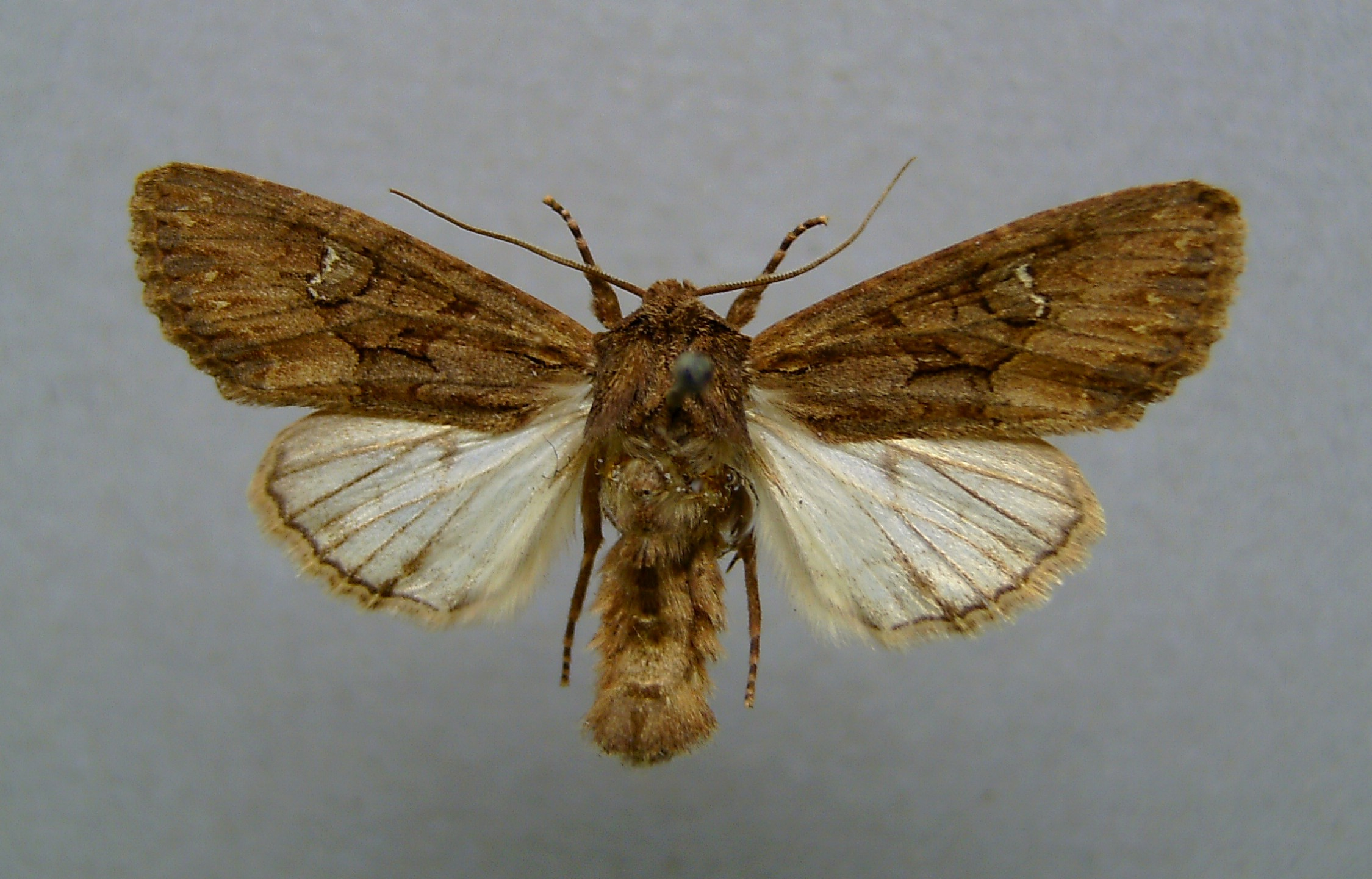
- Mniotype solieri

Scientific classification
- Domain: Eukaryota
- Kingdom: Animalia
- Phylum: Arthropoda
- Class: Insecta
- Order: Lepidoptera
- Superfamily: Noctuoidea
- Family: Noctuidae
- Genus: Mniotype
- Species: M. solieri

Binomial name
- Mniotype solieri (Boisduval, 1829)

= Mniotype solieri =

Species of moth

Mniotype solieri is a species of moth belonging to the family Noctuidae.

It is native to Europe.
