= Spaelotis unicava =

Scientific classification
- Kingdom: Animalia
- Phylum: Arthropoda
- Class: Insecta
- Order: Lepidoptera
- Superfamily: Noctuoidea
- Family: Noctuidae
- Tribe: Noctuini
- Subtribe: Noctuina
- Genus: Spaelotis
- Species: S. unicava

Binomial name
- Spaelotis unicava Lafontaine, 1998

Species of moth

Spaelotis unicava is a species of cutworm or dart moth in the family Noctuidae. It is found in Central America and North America.

The MONA or Hodges number for Spaelotis unicava is 10926.2.
