= Spaelotis havilae =

Scientific classification
- Kingdom: Animalia
- Phylum: Arthropoda
- Clade: Pancrustacea
- Class: Insecta
- Order: Lepidoptera
- Superfamily: Noctuoidea
- Family: Noctuidae
- Genus: Spaelotis
- Species: S. havilae

Binomial name
- Spaelotis havilae (Grote, 1881)

Species of moth

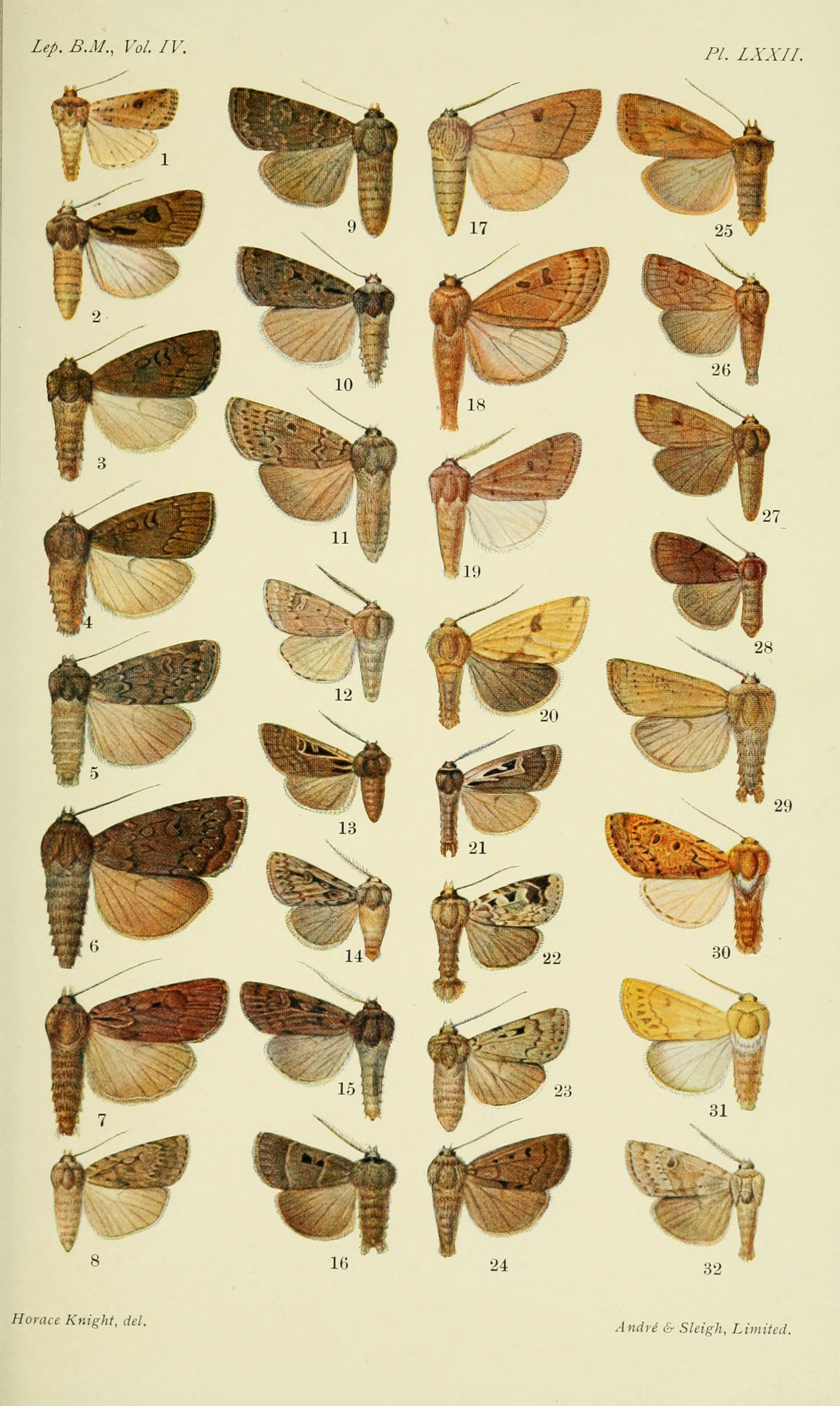
Spaelotis havilae (Specimen 7) with other specimens, drawn by Augustus Radcliffe Grote, 1880

Spaelotis havilae, known generally as the w-marked cutworm or western w-marked cutworm, is a species of cutworm or dart moth in the family Noctuidae. It is found in North America.

The MONA or Hodges number for Spaelotis havilae is 10927.
