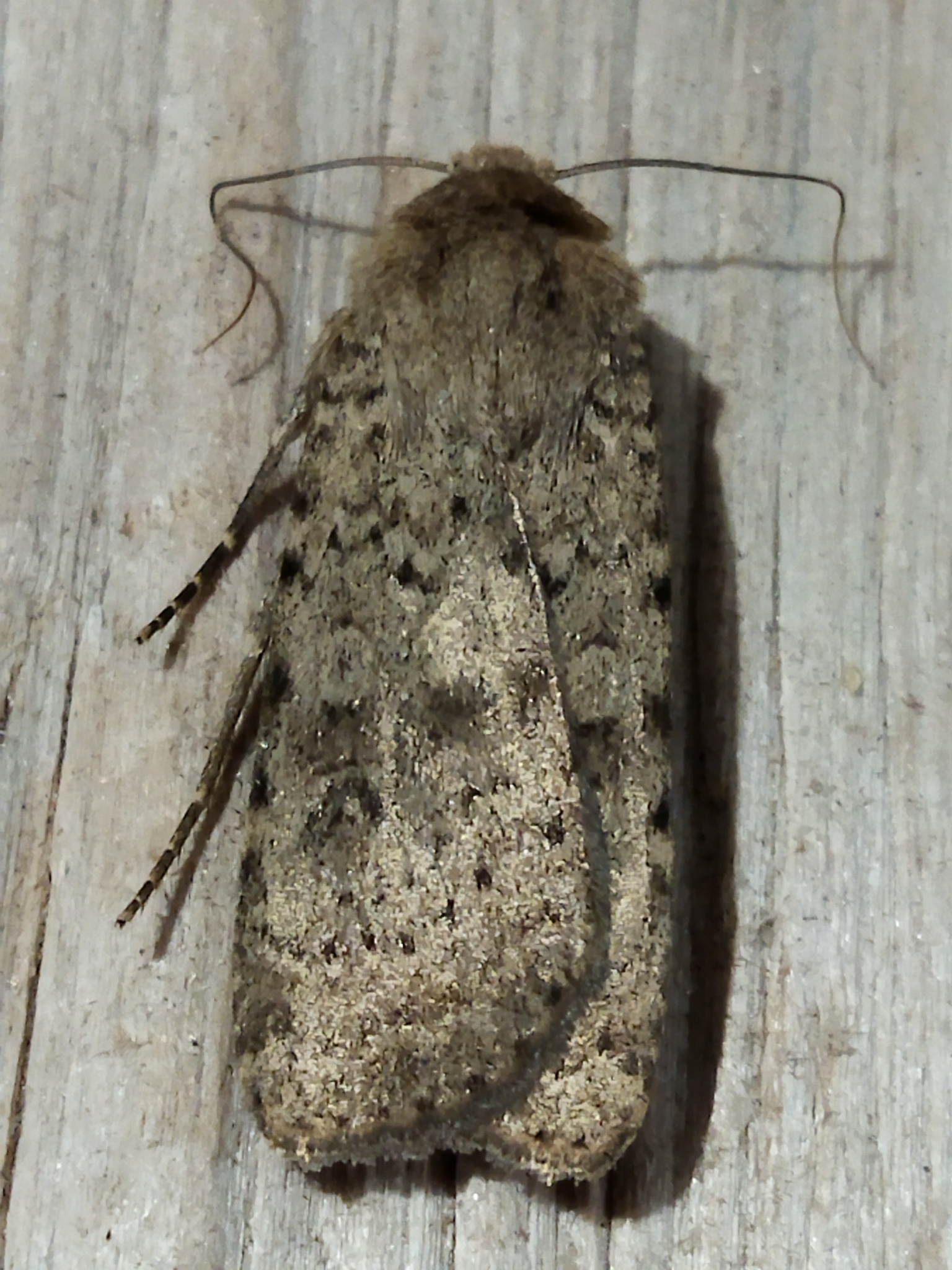

Scientific classification
- Kingdom: Animalia
- Phylum: Arthropoda
- Class: Insecta
- Order: Lepidoptera
- Superfamily: Noctuoidea
- Family: Noctuidae
- Genus: Rhyacia
- Species: R. arenacea

Binomial name
- Rhyacia arenacea (Hampson, 1907)

Synonyms
- Episilia arenacea Hampson, 1907; Rhyacia pseudosimulans Kozhanchikov, 1929

= Rhyacia arenacea =

Species of moth

Rhyacia arenacea is a species of moth in the family Noctuidae. It is widespread in the steppe and semi-desert zone of the central Palearctic realm.

Adults are on wing from May to October. There is one generation per year.

The larvae probably feed on Poaceae species.
