= Spaelotis suecica =

Scientific classification
- Domain: Eukaryota
- Kingdom: Animalia
- Phylum: Arthropoda
- Class: Insecta
- Order: Lepidoptera
- Superfamily: Noctuoidea
- Family: Noctuidae
- Genus: Spaelotis
- Species: S. suecica

Binomial name
- Spaelotis suecica (Aurivilius, 1891)

Species of moth

Spaelotis suecica is a moth belonging to the family Noctuidae. The species was first described by Per Olof Christopher Aurivillius in 1891.

It is native to Eurasia.
