= Rhyacia clemens =

Scientific classification
- Domain: Eukaryota
- Kingdom: Animalia
- Phylum: Arthropoda
- Class: Insecta
- Order: Lepidoptera
- Superfamily: Noctuoidea
- Family: Noctuidae
- Tribe: Noctuini
- Subtribe: Noctuina
- Genus: Rhyacia
- Species: R. clemens

Binomial name
- Rhyacia clemens (Smith, 1890)

Species of moth

Rhyacia clemens is a species of cutworm or dart moth in the family Noctuidae. It is found in North America.

The MONA or Hodges number for Rhyacia clemens is 10925.1.
