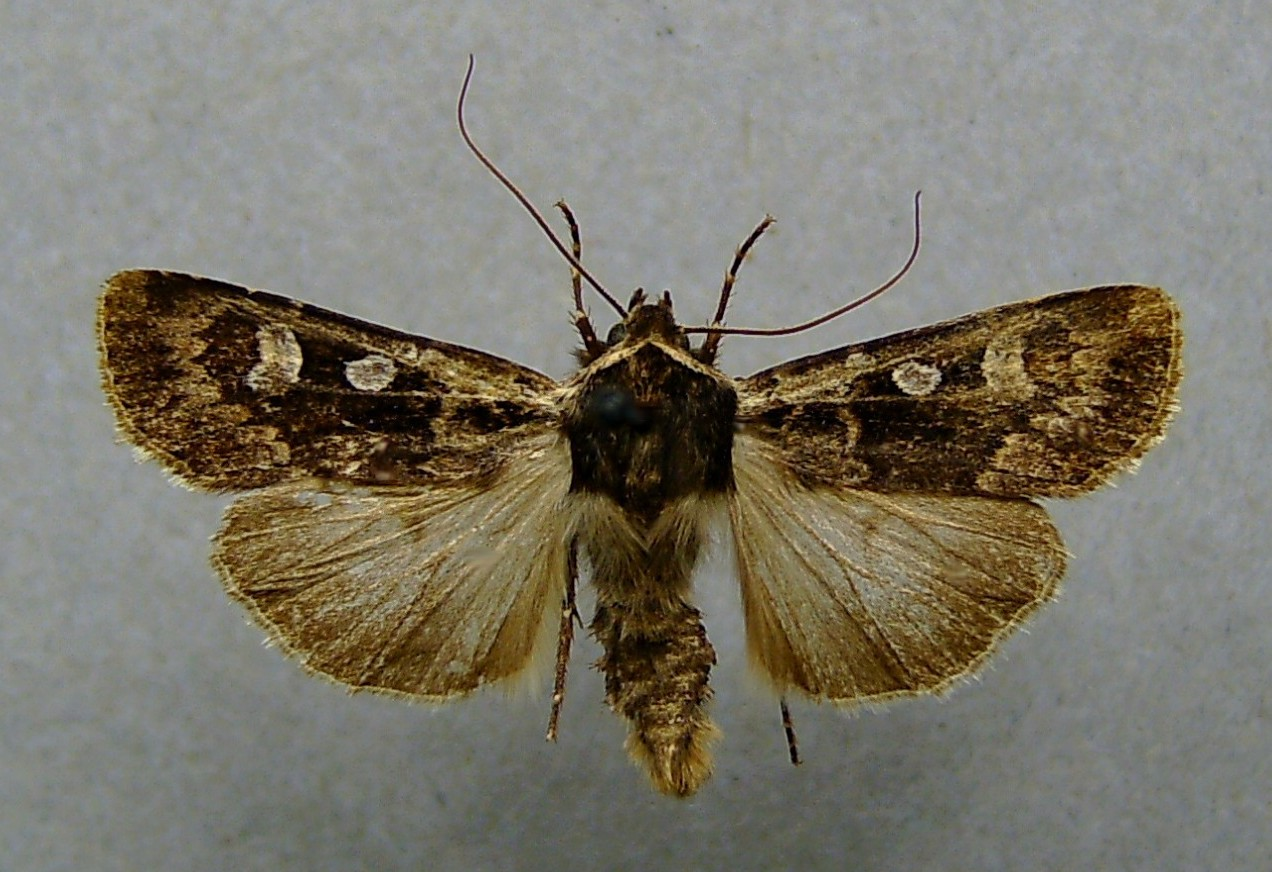

Scientific classification
- Kingdom: Animalia
- Phylum: Arthropoda
- Class: Insecta
- Order: Lepidoptera
- Superfamily: Noctuoidea
- Family: Noctuidae
- Genus: Euxoa
- Species: E. lidia

Binomial name
- Euxoa lidia Stoll, 1782

Synonyms
- Phalaena lidia; Euxoa (Chorizagrotis) lidia

= Euxoa lidia =

Species of moth

Euxoa lidia is a moth of the family Noctuidae. It is found in the coastal areas of northern Europe.

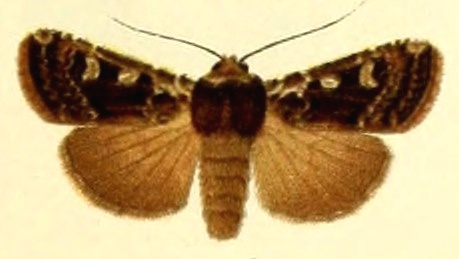

Some authors believe it to be a synonym of Euxoa adumbrata.

The wingspan is 31–37 mm. Adults are on wing from July to August.

The larvae feed on Taraxacum and Polygonum species.
