= Spaelotis bicava =

Scientific classification
- Domain: Eukaryota
- Kingdom: Animalia
- Phylum: Arthropoda
- Class: Insecta
- Order: Lepidoptera
- Superfamily: Noctuoidea
- Family: Noctuidae
- Tribe: Noctuini
- Subtribe: Noctuina
- Genus: Spaelotis
- Species: S. bicava

Binomial name
- Spaelotis bicava Lafontaine, 1998

Species of moth

Spaelotis bicava, the western w-marked cutworm, is a species of cutworm or dart moth in the family Noctuidae. It is found in North America.

The MONA or Hodges number for Spaelotis bicava is 10926.1.
