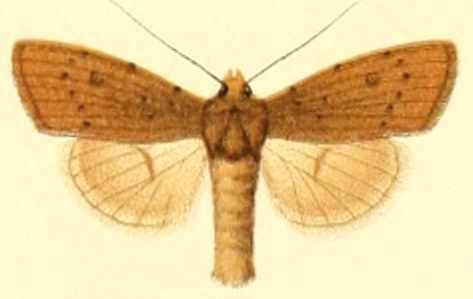

Scientific classification
- Kingdom: Animalia
- Phylum: Arthropoda
- Class: Insecta
- Order: Lepidoptera
- Superfamily: Noctuoidea
- Family: Noctuidae
- Genus: Rhyacia
- Species: R. ledereri

Binomial name
- Rhyacia ledereri (Erschoff, 1870)

Synonyms
- Euxoa ledereri (Erschoff, 1870); Agrotis ledereri Erschoff, 1870; Agrotis rava var. mus Alphéraky, 1882; Rhyacia (Epipsilia) punctinotata Warren, 1914

= Rhyacia ledereri =

Species of moth

Rhyacia ledereri is a moth of the family Noctuidae. It is found in the southern Urals, from central Asia to southern Siberia to the Amur region and in Mongolia, China, Tibet and northern India.
