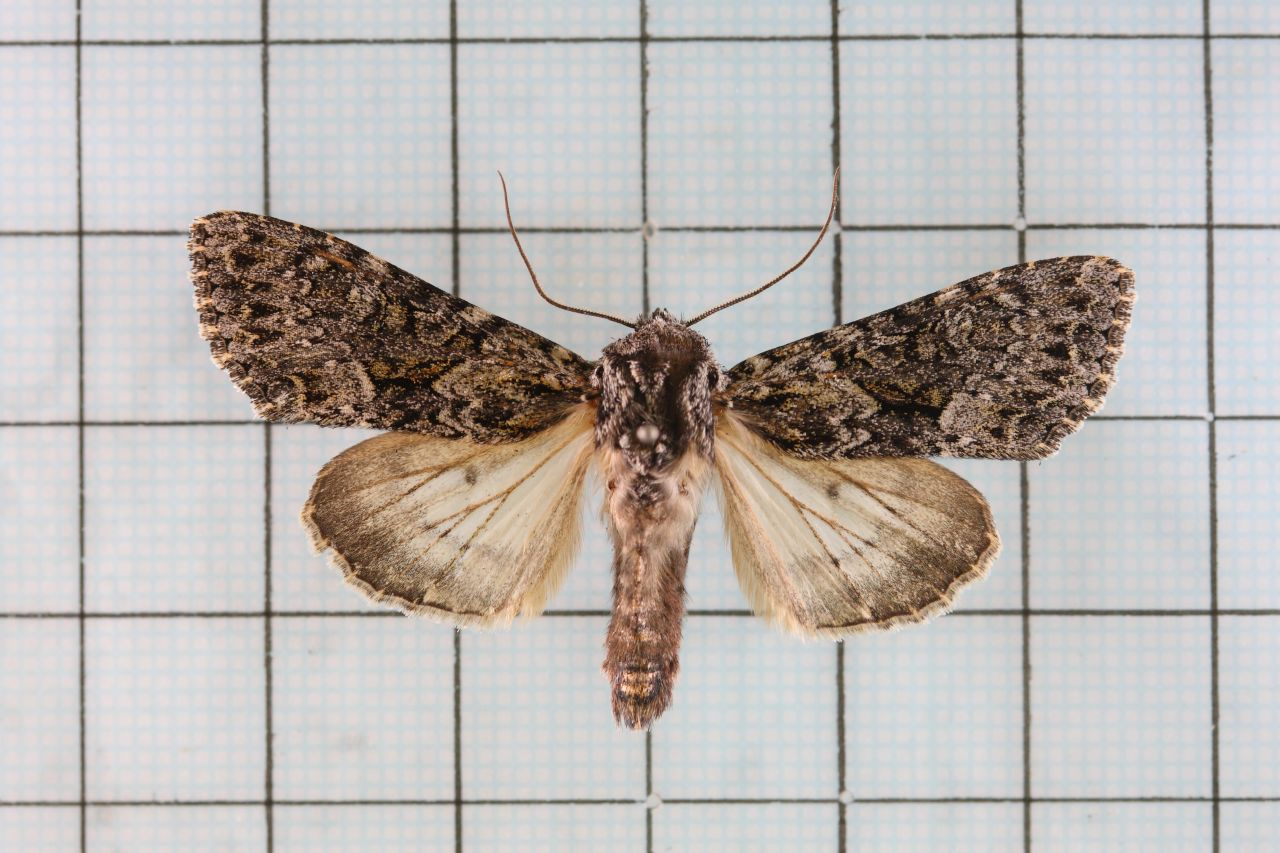

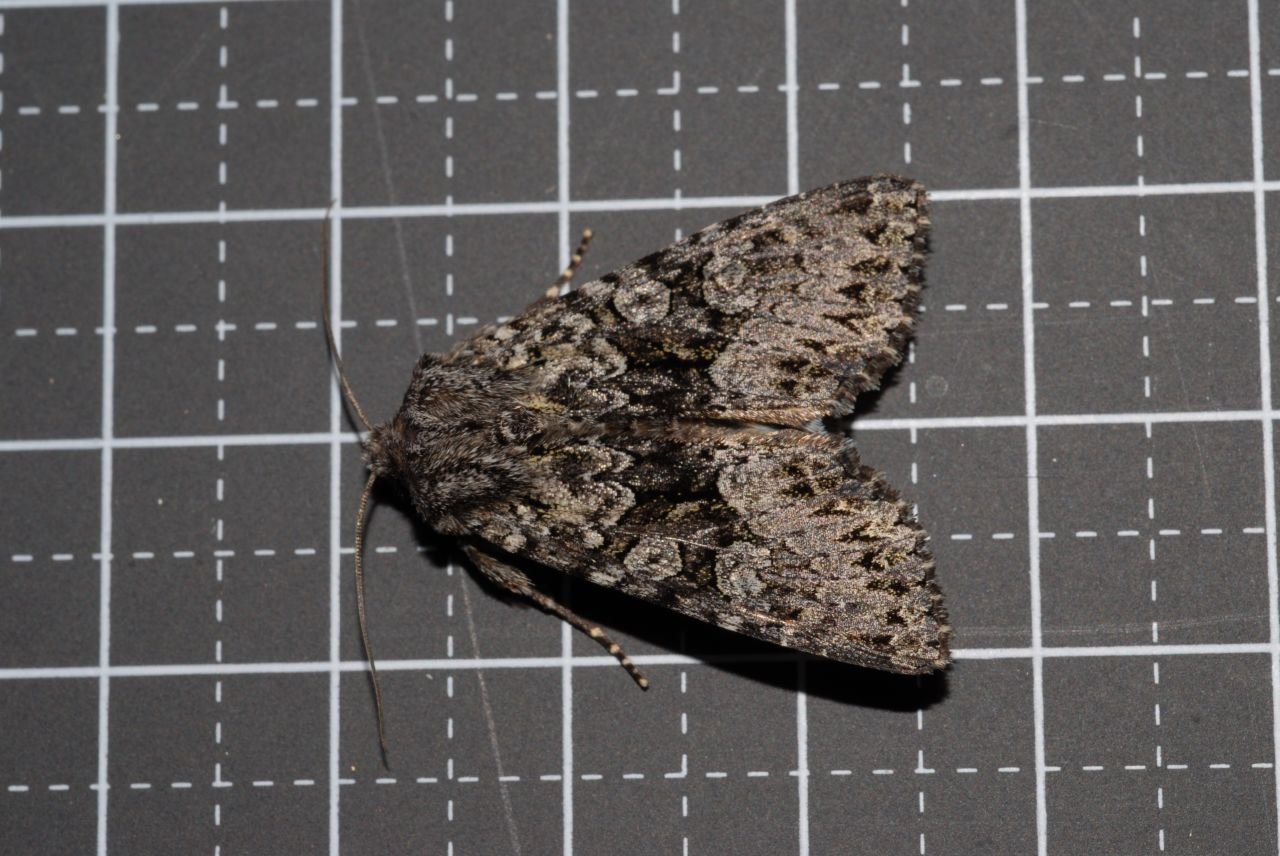

Scientific classification
- Domain: Eukaryota
- Kingdom: Animalia
- Phylum: Arthropoda
- Class: Insecta
- Order: Lepidoptera
- Superfamily: Noctuoidea
- Family: Noctuidae
- Genus: Mniotype
- Species: M. aulombardi

Binomial name
- Mniotype aulombardi Plante, 1994

= Mniotype aulombardi =

Species of moth

Mniotype aulombardi is a moth in the family Noctuidae. It is found in Taiwan.
