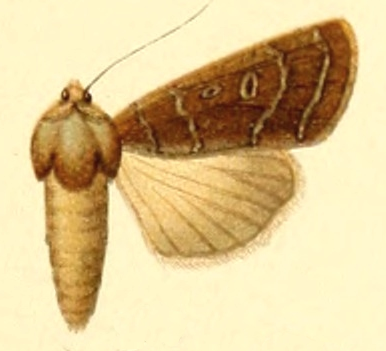

Scientific classification
- Domain: Eukaryota
- Kingdom: Animalia
- Phylum: Arthropoda
- Class: Insecta
- Order: Lepidoptera
- Superfamily: Noctuoidea
- Family: Noctuidae
- Genus: Spaelotis
- Species: S. ravida

Binomial name
- Spaelotis ravida (Denis & Schiffermüller, 1775)

Synonyms
- Noctua ravida Denis & Schiffermüller, 1775; Phalaena (Noctua) obducta Esper, 1789; Phalaena (Noctua) austera Esper, 1789; Phalaena (Noctua) bigramma Esper, 1790; Phalaena (Noctua) obscura Brahm, 1791; Agrotis stabulorum Bienert, [1870]; Agrotis glis Christoph, 1887; Rhyacia salva Corti & Draudt, 1933; Euxoa glis

= Spaelotis ravida =

Species of moth

Spaelotis ravida, the stout dart, is a moth of the family Noctuidae. The species was first described by Michael Denis and Ignaz Schiffermüller in 1775. It is found in the Palearctic realm.

The wingspan is about 42–50 mm. Meyrick describes it Antennae in male ciliated. Forewings fuscous, towards costa rosy-tinged an obscure blackish median dash from base; sub-basal, first, and second lines slightly paler, obscurely darker-edged, distinct on costa; orbicular and reniform partly outlined with black, sometimes connected by a blackish mark or touching, orbicular rather elongate; subterminal line pale, anteriorly with somewhat darker suffusion. Hindwings fuscous-whitish, darker posteriorly. Larva ochreous-brown; dorsal line somewhat paler; subdorsal series of curved or sometimes nearly straight oblique yellowish marks, edged above with dark fuscous; head grey, fuscous marked. Adults are on wing from July to August.

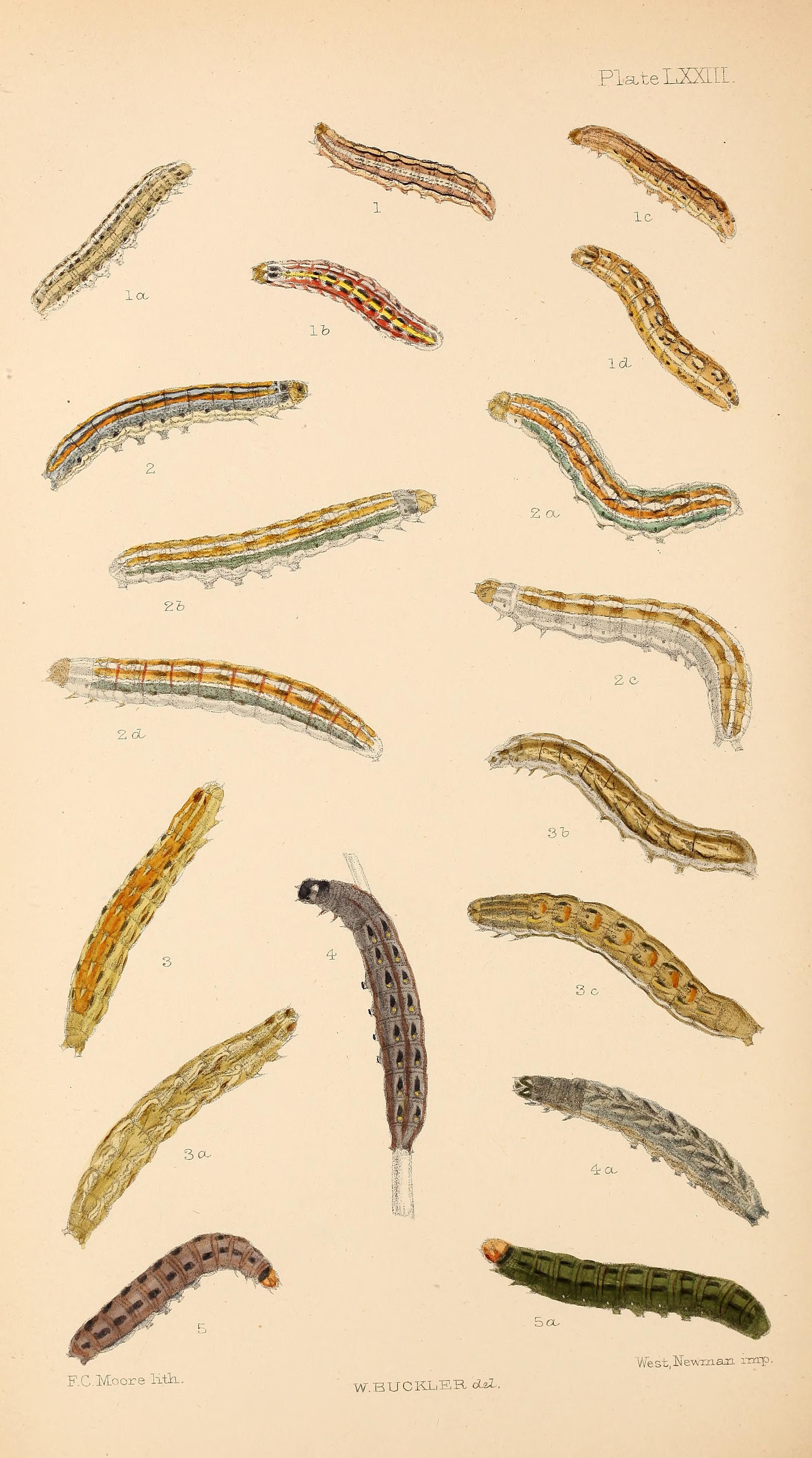
3,3a,3b,3c larva after last moult

The larvae feed on Artemisia, Cirsium, Rumex, and Taraxacum species.

The species is suspected to have disappeared from the United Kingdom as a resident species during the first decade of the 21st century.
