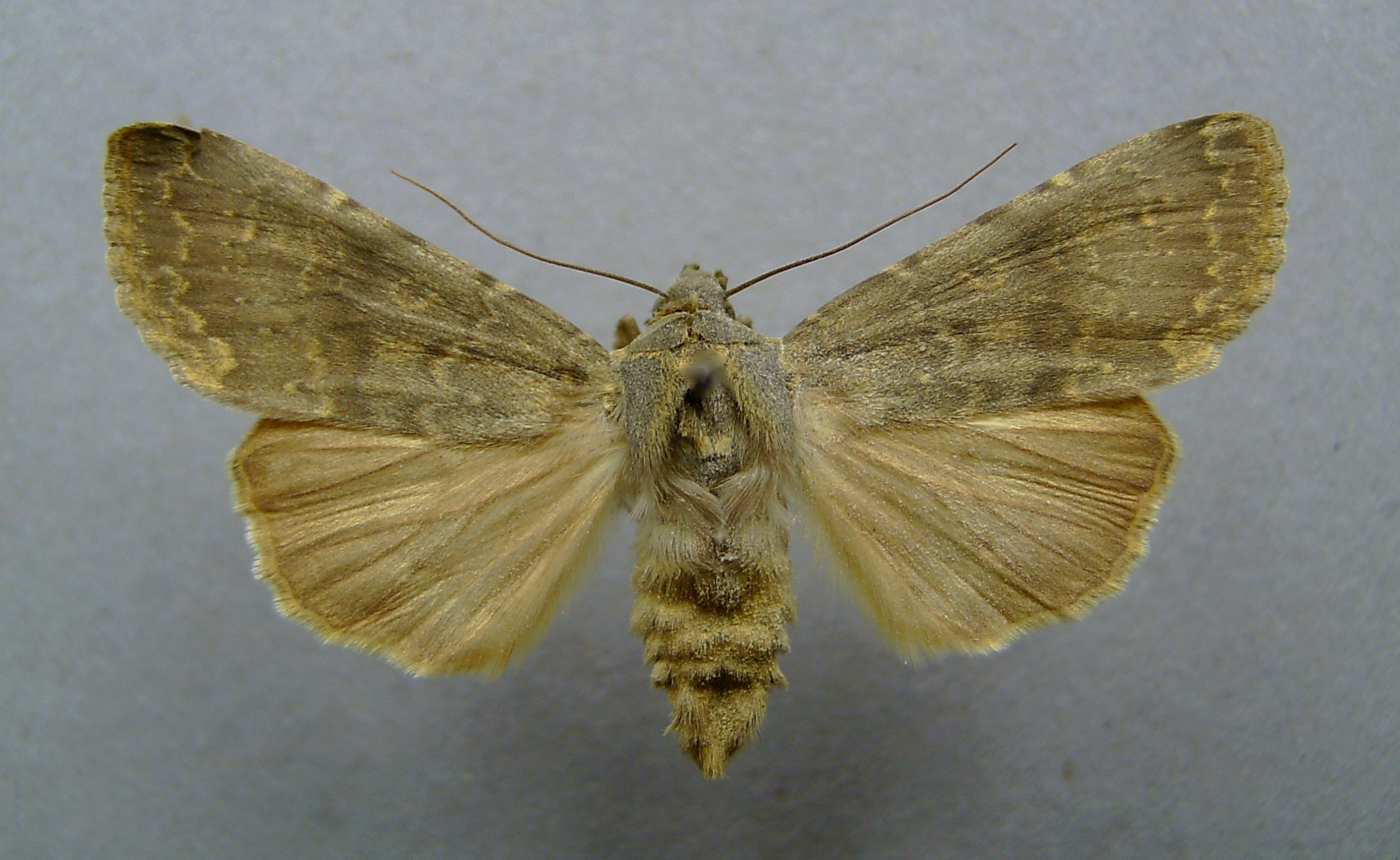

Scientific classification
- Kingdom: Animalia
- Phylum: Arthropoda
- Class: Insecta
- Order: Lepidoptera
- Superfamily: Noctuoidea
- Family: Noctuidae
- Genus: Rhyacia
- Species: R. lucipeta

Binomial name
- Rhyacia lucipeta (Denis & Schiffermüller, 1775)

Synonyms
- Noctua lucipeta Denis & Schiffermüller, 1775

= Rhyacia lucipeta =

Species of moth

Rhyacia lucipeta, the southern rustic, is a moth of the family Noctuidae. It is found in Morocco, Algeria, the Pyrenees, the mountains of central Europe, Italy, the Balkans, Turkey, the Caucasus, Transcaucasia and Iraq.

The wingspan is 56–64 mm. Adults are on wing from June to the beginning of October in one generation.

The larvae feed on various herbaceous plants, including Cerastium, Thymus pulegioides, Tussilago farfara and Campanula rotundifolia.
