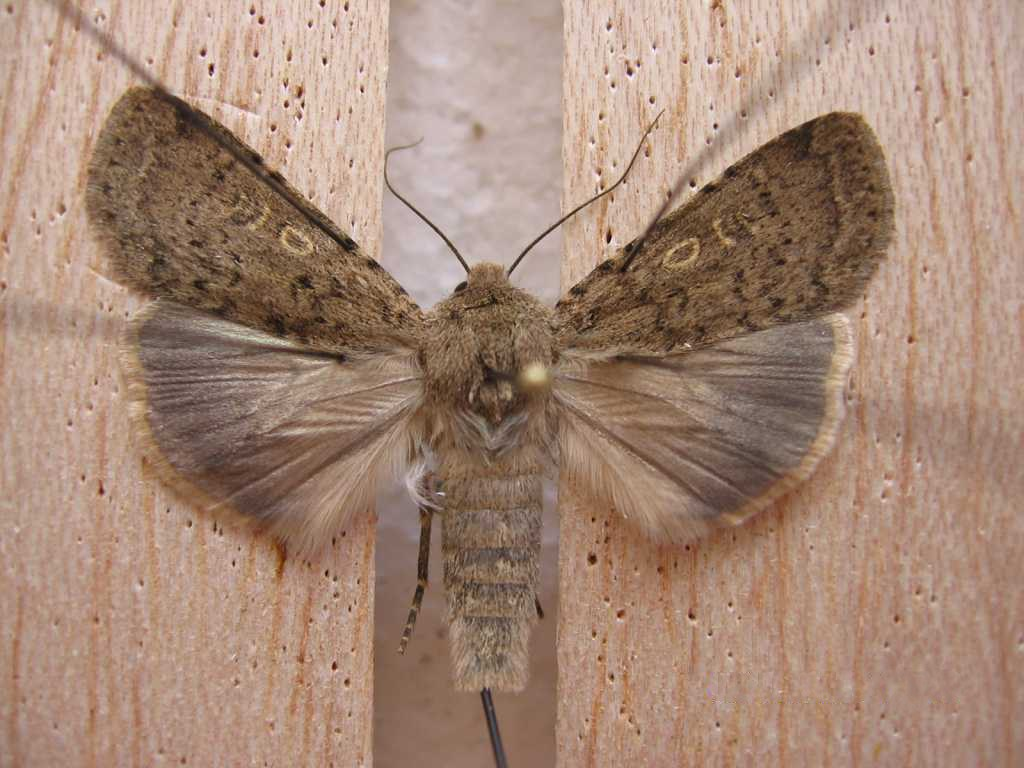

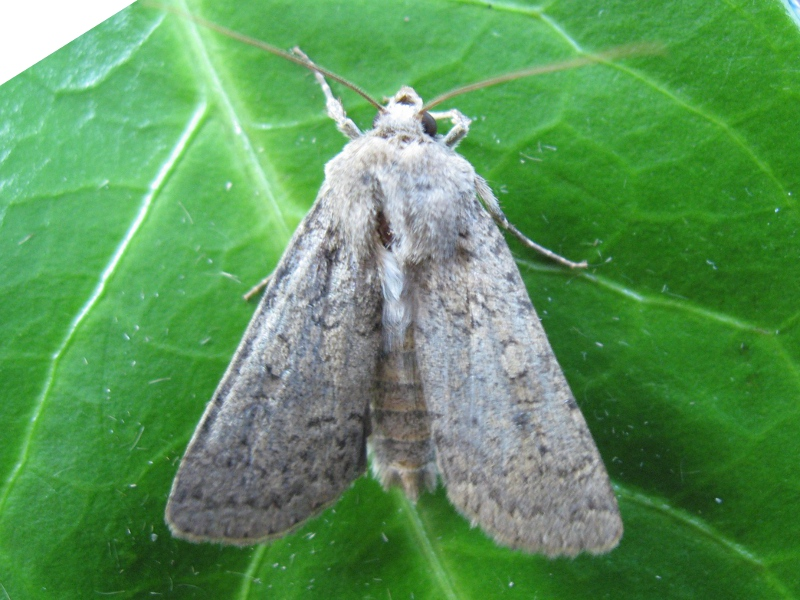

Scientific classification
- Domain: Eukaryota
- Kingdom: Animalia
- Phylum: Arthropoda
- Class: Insecta
- Order: Lepidoptera
- Superfamily: Noctuoidea
- Family: Noctuidae
- Genus: Rhyacia
- Species: R. simulans

Binomial name
- Rhyacia simulans (Hufnagel, 1766)

Synonyms
- Phalaena simulans Hufnagel, 1766; Noctua tristis Fabricius, 1775; Noctua pyrophila [Schiffermüller], 1775; Phalaena (Noctua) radicea Esper, 1789; Agrotis simulans var. obscurata Staudinger, 1901; Agrotis augurides Rothschild, 1914; Standfussiana simulans

= Rhyacia simulans =

Dotted rustic

Species of moth

Rhyacia simulans, the dotted rustic, is a moth of the family Noctuidae. The species was first described by Johann Siegfried Hufnagel in 1766. It is found in most of Europe, south to Morocco, Algeria and Tunisia, east to Turkey, the Caucasus, Tomsk and Minusinsk.

== Technical description and variation ==
The wingspan is 45–60 mm. It is like Epipsilia latens Hbn. but larger; the forewing paler, the stigmata with distinct pale and dark outlines. pyrophila Schiff. is ochreous grey; suffusa Tutt is darker, the forewing being blackish grey; —latens Stph. is unicolorous black, with still more intense markings. Grey or greyish-brown moth. The forewing is pale grey or greyish-brown with small, black-edged kidney and ring markings and more or less distinct, double, dark intermediate lines that delimit the central field of the wing. The outer edge is usually a little lighter than the rest in dark specimens. The hind wing is grey.

== Biology ==
Adults are on wing from June to September.

Larva dark brown; the subdorsal area brownish-tannish peach; dorsal line thin, pale, edged with black; a row of dorsal V-shaped marks; an interrupted white lateral stripe.

The larvae feed on Gramineae, Rumex and Taraxacum species.
