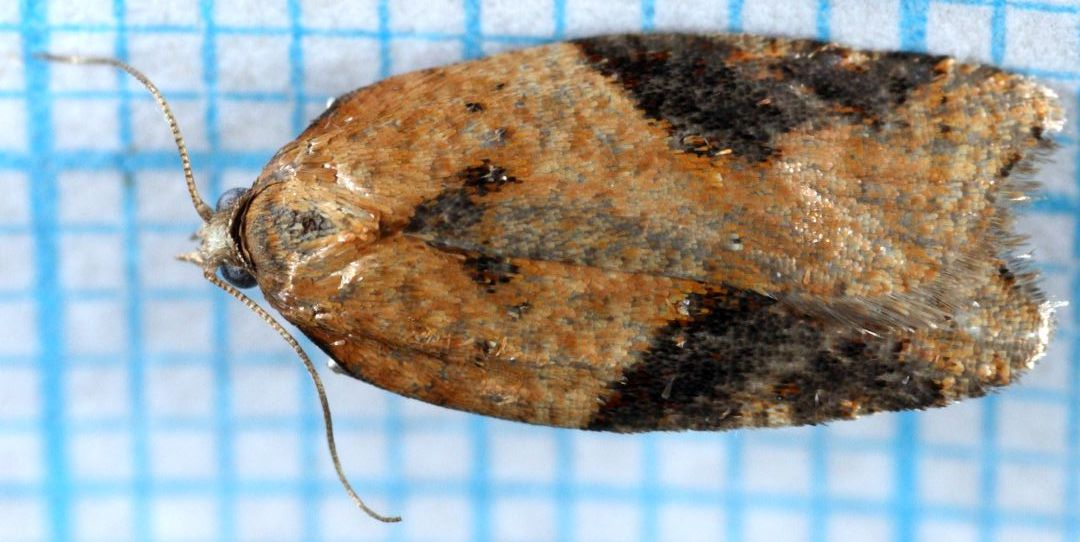

Scientific classification
- Kingdom: Animalia
- Phylum: Arthropoda
- Clade: Pancrustacea
- Class: Insecta
- Order: Lepidoptera
- Family: Tortricidae
- Genus: Acleris
- Species: A. comariana

Binomial name
- Acleris comariana (Lienig & Zeller, 1846)

Synonyms
- Teras comariana Lienig & Zeller, 1846; Acalla baracola Matsumura, 1931; Peronea comariana ab. brunneana Sheldon, 1925; Peronea comariana ab. comparana Sheldon, 1925; Peronea comariana ab. fasciana Sheldon, 1925; Peronea comariana ab. fuscana Sheldon, 1925; Peronea comariana ab. latifasciana Sheldon, 1925; Acalla meincki Amsel, 1930; Peronea comariana ab. potentillana Morris, 1898; Tortrix proteana Herrich-Schaffer, 1847; Teras comariana ab. proteana Herrich-Schaffer, 1851

= Acleris comariana =

Species of moth

Acleris comariana, the strawberry tortrix, is a moth of the family Tortricidae. It is found in Europe, the Caucasus, Amur, Kamchatka, China, Korea and Japan.

The wingspan is 13–18 mm. The forewings are oblong, grey, sometimes tinged with ochreous or reddish, distinctly darker-strigulated; tufts small, numerous, sometimes partly black; edge of basal patch darker dorsally; a large triangular red-brown, dark fuscous, or blackish-grey blotch on costa, sometimes with indistinct extension of central fascia to dorsum. The hindwings are grey or pale grey.The larva is pale green or whitish; dorsal and subdorsal lines sometimes darker; head and plate of 2 pale yellow-brown or black. Julius von Kennel provides a full description. The species can be difficult to distinguish from Acleris laterana A genitalic preparation must be examined to determine the two species.

The larvae feed on wild and cultivated strawberries and related plants and can become a pest in strawberry fields.
