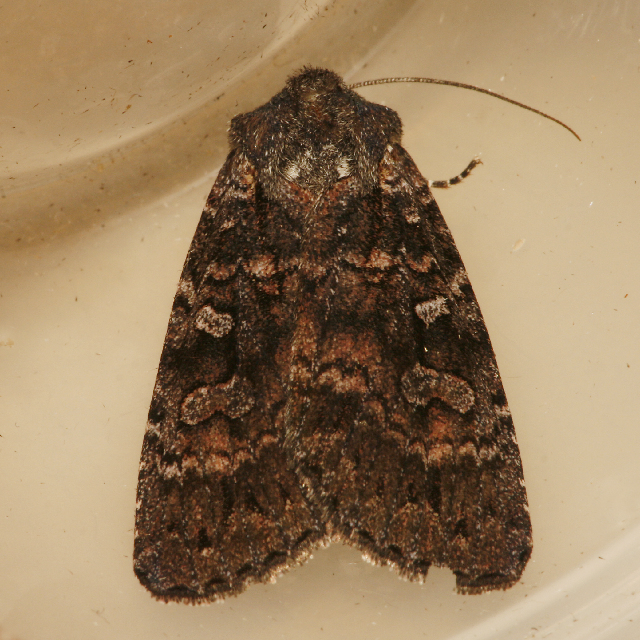

Scientific classification
- Domain: Eukaryota
- Kingdom: Animalia
- Phylum: Arthropoda
- Class: Insecta
- Order: Lepidoptera
- Superfamily: Noctuoidea
- Family: Noctuidae
- Genus: Eurois
- Species: E. astricta

Binomial name
- Eurois astricta Morrison, 1874

Synonyms
- Eurois astricta elenae (Barnes & Benjamin, 1926); Eurois astricta subjugata (Dyar, 1904)

= Eurois astricta =

Species of moth

Eurois astricta, the great brown dart, is a species of cutworm or dart moth in the family Noctuidae. It was first described by Herbert Knowles Morrison in 1874 and it is found in North America.

== Subspecies ==
Two subspecies belong to Eurois astricta:

- Eurois astricta astricta ^{g}
- Eurois astricta elenae Barnes & Benjamin, 1926^{c g}

Data sources: i = ITIS, c = Catalogue of Life, g = GBIF, b = Bugguide.net
