= Mniotype deluccai =

Scientific classification
- Domain: Eukaryota
- Kingdom: Animalia
- Phylum: Arthropoda
- Class: Insecta
- Order: Lepidoptera
- Superfamily: Noctuoidea
- Family: Noctuidae
- Genus: Mniotype
- Species: M. deluccai

Binomial name
- Mniotype deluccai (Berio, 1976)

Synonyms
- Blepharita solieri deluccai Berio, 1976; Blepharita vallettai Laever, 1980

Species of moth

Mniotype deluccai is a moth of the family Noctuidae. Emilio Berio first used the scientific name in 1976. It is found on Malta.
