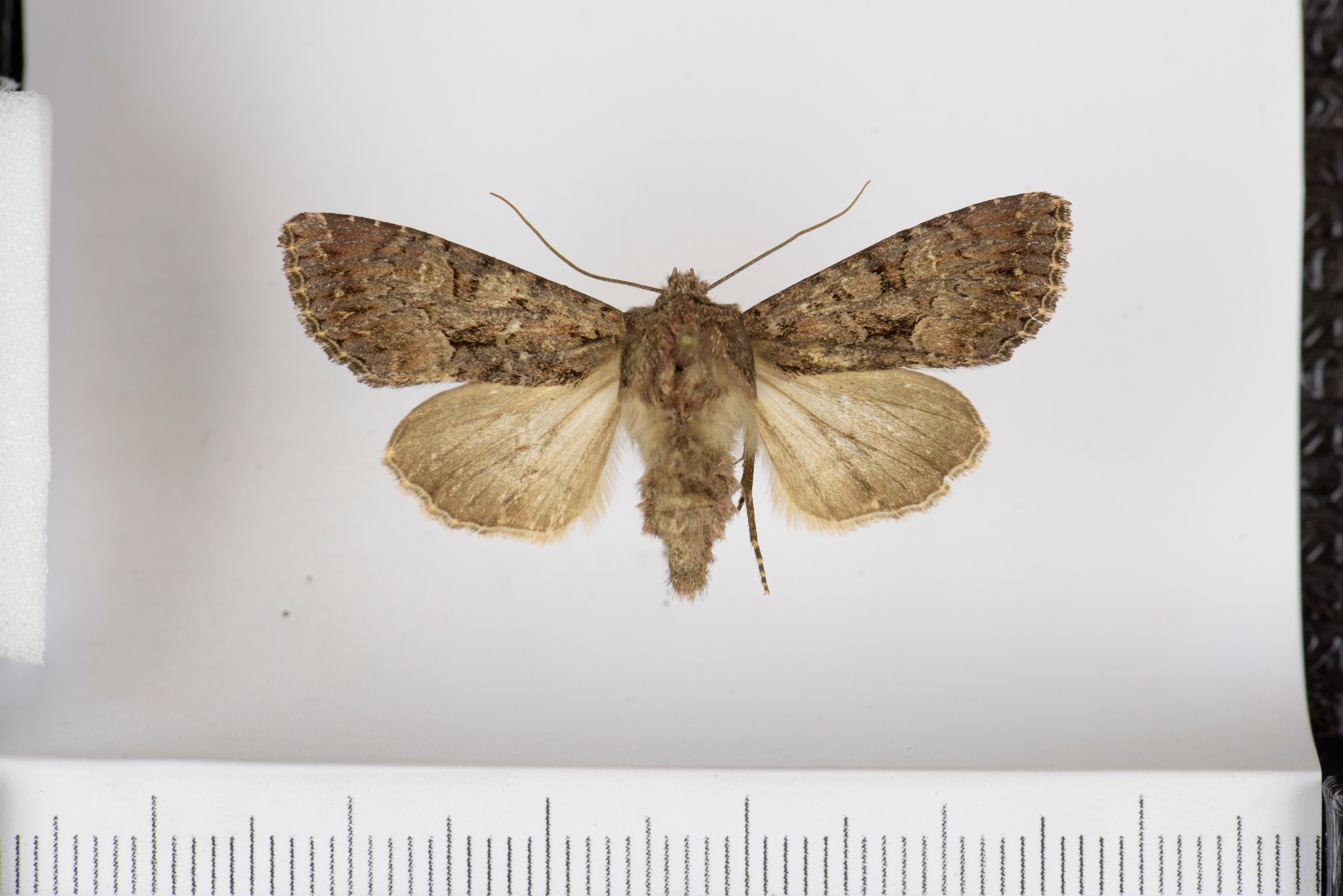

Scientific classification
- Domain: Eukaryota
- Kingdom: Animalia
- Phylum: Arthropoda
- Class: Insecta
- Order: Lepidoptera
- Superfamily: Noctuoidea
- Family: Noctuidae
- Genus: Mniotype
- Species: M. bathensis

Binomial name
- Mniotype bathensis (Lutzau, 1905)

= Mniotype bathensis =

Species of moth

Mniotype bathensis is a moth belonging to the family Noctuidae. The species was first described by Lutzau in 1905.

It is native to Eurasia.
