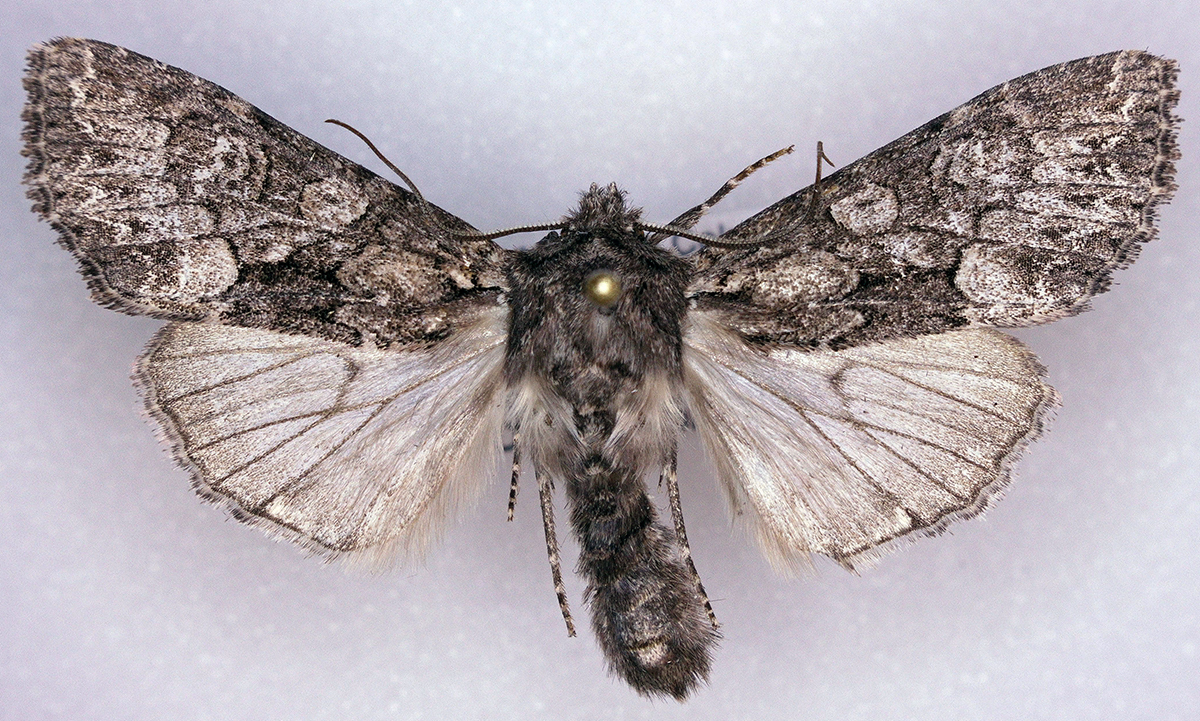

Scientific classification
- Domain: Eukaryota
- Kingdom: Animalia
- Phylum: Arthropoda
- Class: Insecta
- Order: Lepidoptera
- Superfamily: Noctuoidea
- Family: Noctuidae
- Tribe: Xylenini
- Subtribe: Antitypina
- Genus: Mniotype
- Species: M. pallescens

Binomial name
- Mniotype pallescens McDunnough, 1946

= Mniotype pallescens =

Species of moth

Mniotype pallescens is a species of cutworm or dart moth in the family Noctuidae. It is found in North America.
