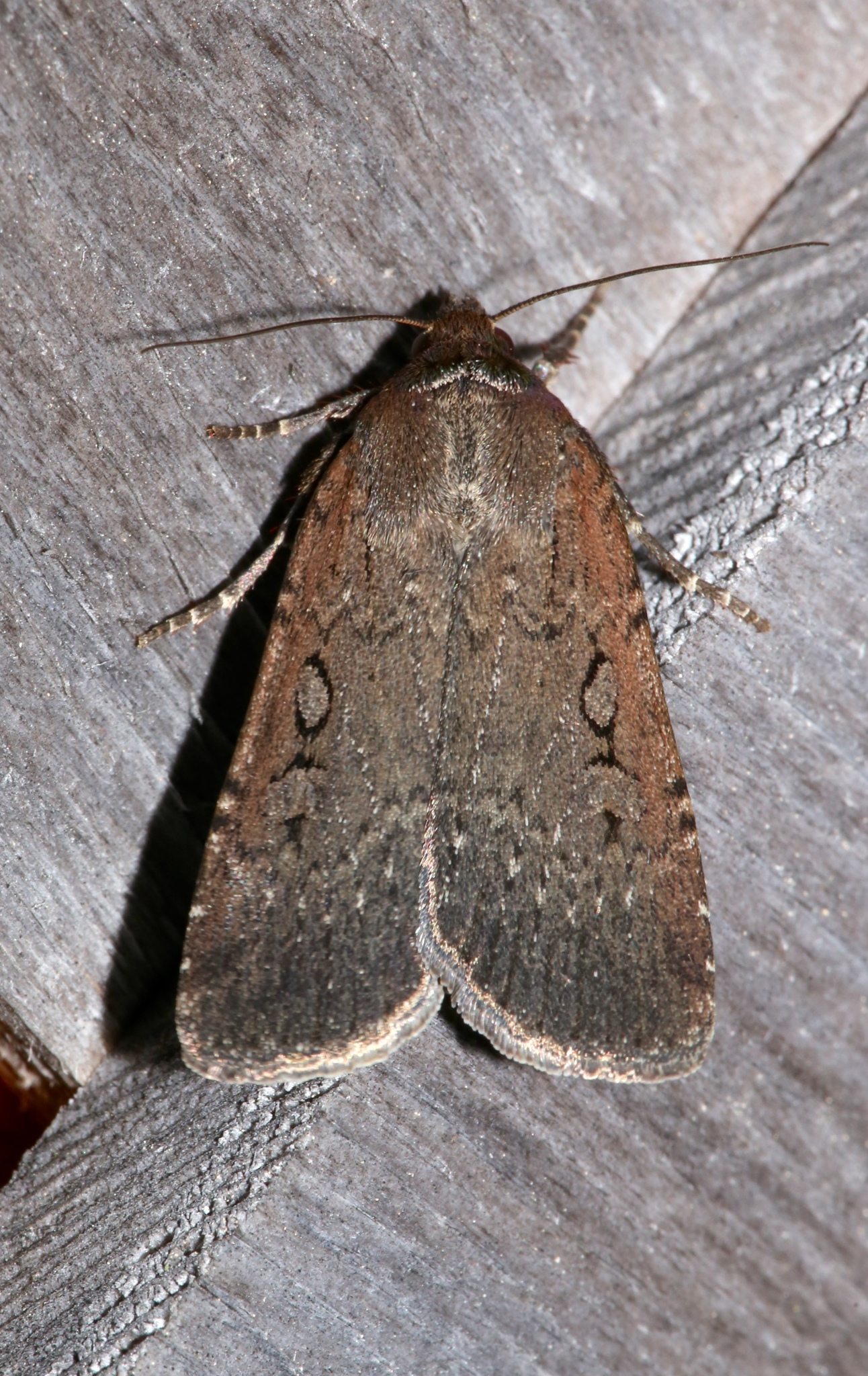
- Spaelotis clandestina

Scientific classification
- Domain: Eukaryota
- Kingdom: Animalia
- Phylum: Arthropoda
- Class: Insecta
- Order: Lepidoptera
- Superfamily: Noctuoidea
- Family: Noctuidae
- Subtribe: Noctuina
- Genus: Spaelotis; Boisduval, 1840

= Spaelotis =

Genus of moths

Spaelotis is a genus of moths of the family Noctuidae.

== Species ==
- Spaelotis bicava Lafontaine, 1998
- Spaelotis clandestina (Harris, 1841)
- Spaelotis demavendi (Wagner, 1937)
- Spaelotis deplorata (Staudinger, 1896)
- Spaelotis dominans (Corti & Draudt, 1933)
- Spaelotis havilae (Grote, 1880)
- Spaelotis lucens Butler, 1881
- Spaelotis nyctophasma Hacker, 1990
- Spaelotis quadricava Lafontaine, 1998
- Spaelotis ravida ([Schiffermüller], 1775)
- Spaelotis restricta Boursin, 1968
- Spaelotis scotopsis Boursin, 1963
- Spaelotis senna (Freyer, 1829)
- Spaelotis sennina Boursin, 1955
- Spaelotis sinophysa Boursin, 1955
- Spaelotis solida (Erschoff, 1874)
- Spaelotis stoetzneri (Corti, 1928)
- Spaelotis suecica (Aurivillius, 1891)
- Spaelotis unicava Lafontaine, 1998
- Spaelotis valida (Walker, 1865)
- Spaelotis velicava Lafontaine, 1998
