= Eurois nigra =

Scientific classification
- Kingdom: Animalia
- Phylum: Arthropoda
- Clade: Pancrustacea
- Class: Insecta
- Order: Lepidoptera
- Superfamily: Noctuoidea
- Family: Noctuidae
- Genus: Eurois
- Species: E. nigra

Binomial name
- Eurois nigra (Smith, 1892)

Species of moth

Eurois nigra, the great black dart moth, is a species of cutworm or dart moth in the family Noctuidae. It was first described by Smith in 1927 and it is found in North America.

== Subspecies ==
Two subspecies belong to Eurois nigra:

- Eurois nigra argni Barnes & Benjamin, 1927^{c g}
- Eurois nigra nigra^{g}

Data sources: i = ITIS, c = Catalogue of Life, g = GBIF, b = Bugguide.net
