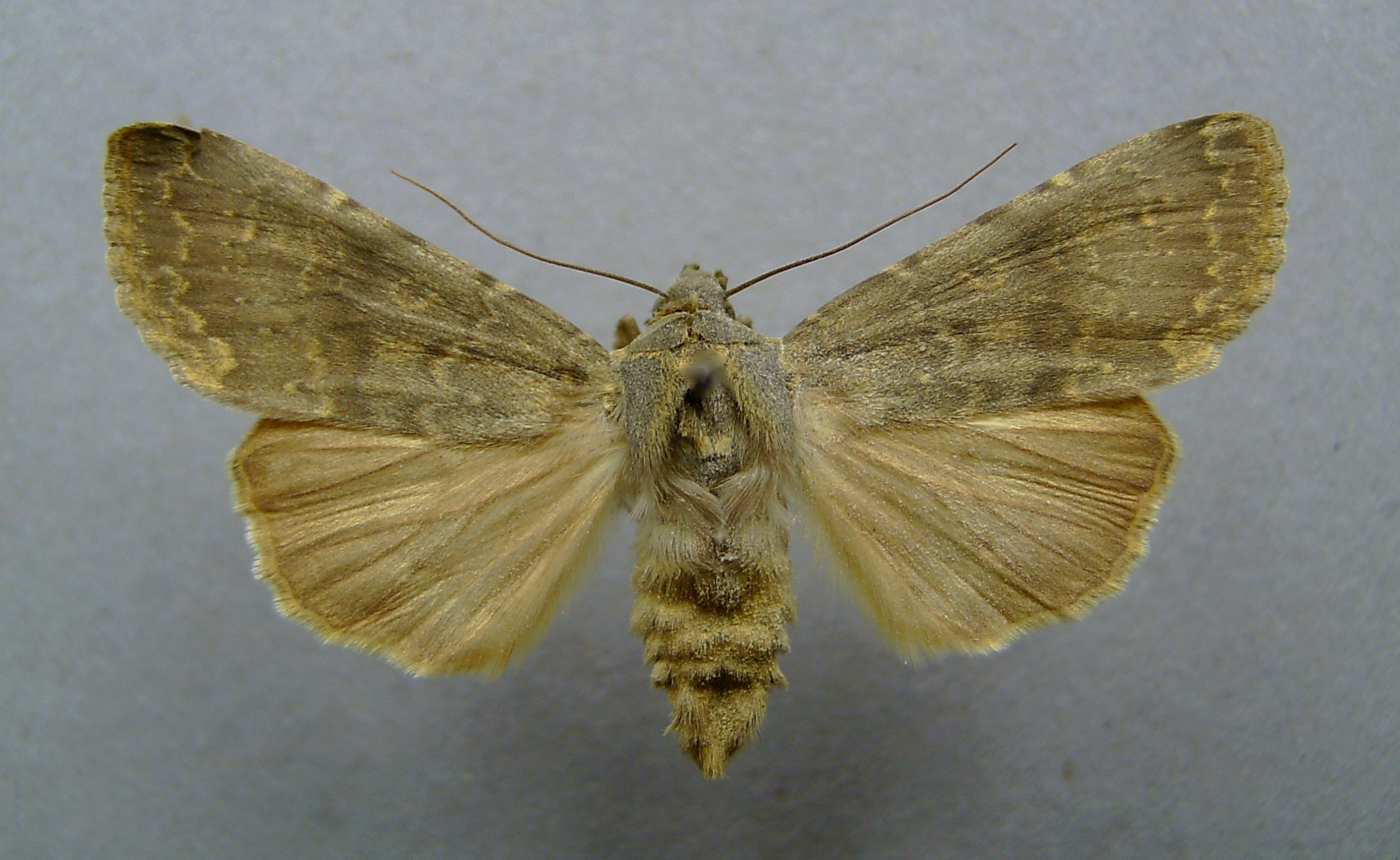
- Rhyacia lucipeta

Scientific classification
- Kingdom: Animalia
- Phylum: Arthropoda
- Clade: Pancrustacea
- Class: Insecta
- Order: Lepidoptera
- Superfamily: Noctuoidea
- Family: Noctuidae
- Subtribe: Noctuina
- Genus: Rhyacia; Hübner, 1821

= Rhyacia =

Genus of moths

Rhyacia is a genus of moths of the family Noctuidae.

== Species ==
- Rhyacia arenacea (Hampson, 1907)
- Rhyacia caradrinoides (Staudinger, 1896)
- Rhyacia clemens (Smith, 1890)
- Rhyacia electra (Staudinger, 1888)
- Rhyacia helvetina (Boisduval, 1833)
- Rhyacia junonia (Staudinger, 1881)
- Rhyacia ledereri (Erschoff, 1870)
- Rhyacia lucipeta ([Schiffermüller], 1775)
- Rhyacia nyctymerides (O. Bang-Haas, 1922)
- Rhyacia nyctymerina (Staudinger, 1888)
- Rhyacia quadrangula (Zetterstedt, 1839)
- Rhyacia simulans (Hufnagel, 1766)
