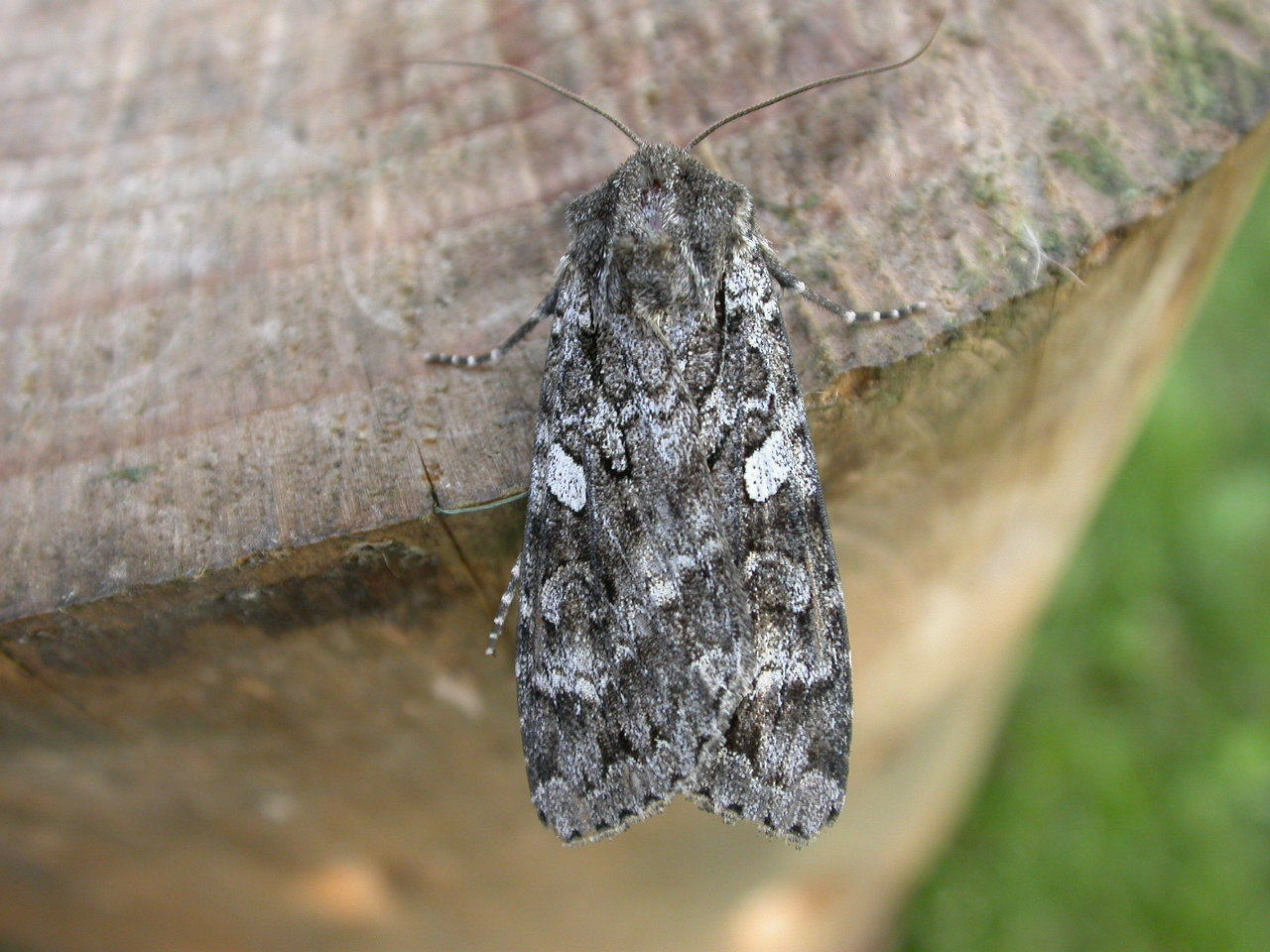
- Eurois occulta

Scientific classification
- Kingdom: Animalia
- Phylum: Arthropoda
- Clade: Pancrustacea
- Class: Insecta
- Order: Lepidoptera
- Superfamily: Noctuoidea
- Family: Noctuidae
- Subtribe: Noctuina
- Genus: Eurois; Hübner, 1821

= Eurois =

Genus of moths

Eurois is a genus of moths of the family Noctuidae first described by Jacob Hübner in 1821.

== Description ==
Its eyes are naked and without eyelashes. The proboscis is well developed. Palpi upturned, reaching vertex of head, and smoothly scaled. Thorax with a small furrowed tuft beyond collar and a pair of tufts on metathorax. Abdomen tuftless, where the dorsal part of proximal segments clothed with coarse hair. Tibia spineless. Forewings with crenulate cilia.

== Species ==
- Eurois astricta Morrison, 1874
- Eurois inclusa Walker, 1865
- Eurois nigra Smith, 1892
- Eurois occulta (Linnaeus, 1758)
- Eurois repugnans Walker, 1857
- Eurois retrahens Walker, 1856

Eurois praefixa is now known as Richia praefixa. Eurois docilis (Grote, 1881) is considered a synonym of Richia praefixa.
