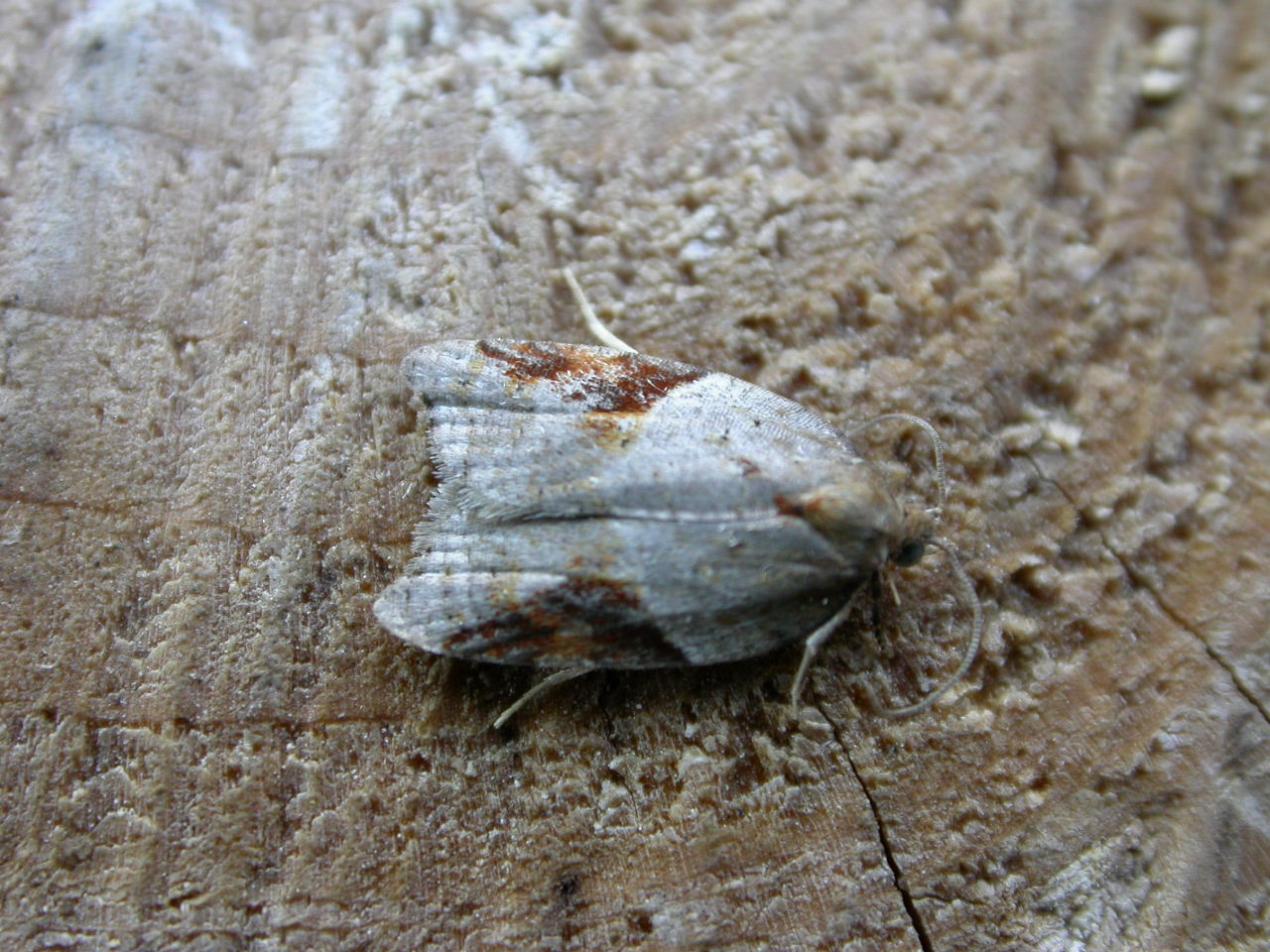

Scientific classification
- Domain: Eukaryota
- Kingdom: Animalia
- Phylum: Arthropoda
- Class: Insecta
- Order: Lepidoptera
- Family: Tortricidae
- Genus: Acleris
- Species: A. laterana

Binomial name
- Acleris laterana (Fabricius, 1794)

Synonyms
- Pyralis laterana Fabricius, 1794; Pyralis abildgaardana Fabricius, 1794; Teras comparanum var. cinereana Reuter, 1899; Tortrix comparana ab. comparana Hubner, [1823]; Acalla schalleriana ab. faaborgensis Strand, 1922; Tortrix laterana ab. labeculana Freyer, 1833; Tortrix latifasciana Haworth, [1811]; Peronea perplexana Barrett, 1881

= Acleris laterana =

Species of moth

Acleris laterana is a moth of the family Tortricidae. It is native to the Palearctic realm, but has been accidentally imported into the United States.

The wingspan is about 15–20 mm.The forewings are oblong, pale reddish-brown, fuscous, or dark fuscous, darker-strigulated; tufts slight, a larger one in middle of disc; edge of basal patch darker dorsally; a large triangular red-brown or blackish-fuscous blotch on costa, anterior edge deep red-brown, sometimes with extension of central fascia to dorsum. Hindwings pale grey.The larva is green whitish; dorsal line green; head and plate of 2 pale brown. It is quite variable, but the forewing almost always has a rather broad, reddish, triangular to trapezoidal spot at the leading edge. The species can be difficult to distinguish from Acleris comariana A genitalic preparation must be examined to determine the two species.

In Europe, adults are on wing from June to July and again from August to September.

The larvae feed on Crataegus, Filipendula ulmaria, Populus, Prunus, Rosa, Rubus, Sorbus, Salix, Symphytum officinale and Vaccinium. The larvae can be found from May to June.
