= Sympistis nigrita =

Scientific classification
- Domain: Eukaryota
- Kingdom: Animalia
- Phylum: Arthropoda
- Class: Insecta
- Order: Lepidoptera
- Superfamily: Noctuoidea
- Family: Noctuidae
- Genus: Sympistis
- Species: S. nigrita

Binomial name
- Sympistis nigrita (Boisduval, 1840)

Synonyms
- Anarta zetterstedtii; Sympistis zetterstedtii; Sympistis sibirica; Anarta nigrita; Sympistis nigrita; Sympistis besla (Skinner & Mengel, 1892); Sympistis kolthoffi; Sympistis labradoris (Staudinger, 1901)

Species of moth

Sympistis nigrita is a moth of the family Noctuidae. The nominate subspecies is found in the Northern part of Europe.

The wingspan is 22–25 mm(.8661-.9843in).

The larvae feed on Dryas octopetala.

== Subspecies ==
- Sympistis nigrita nigrita (central Europe)
- Sympistis nigrita zetterstedtii (northern Eurasia and into northwestern North America)
- Sympistis nigrita kolthoffi (Alaska and Yukon)
