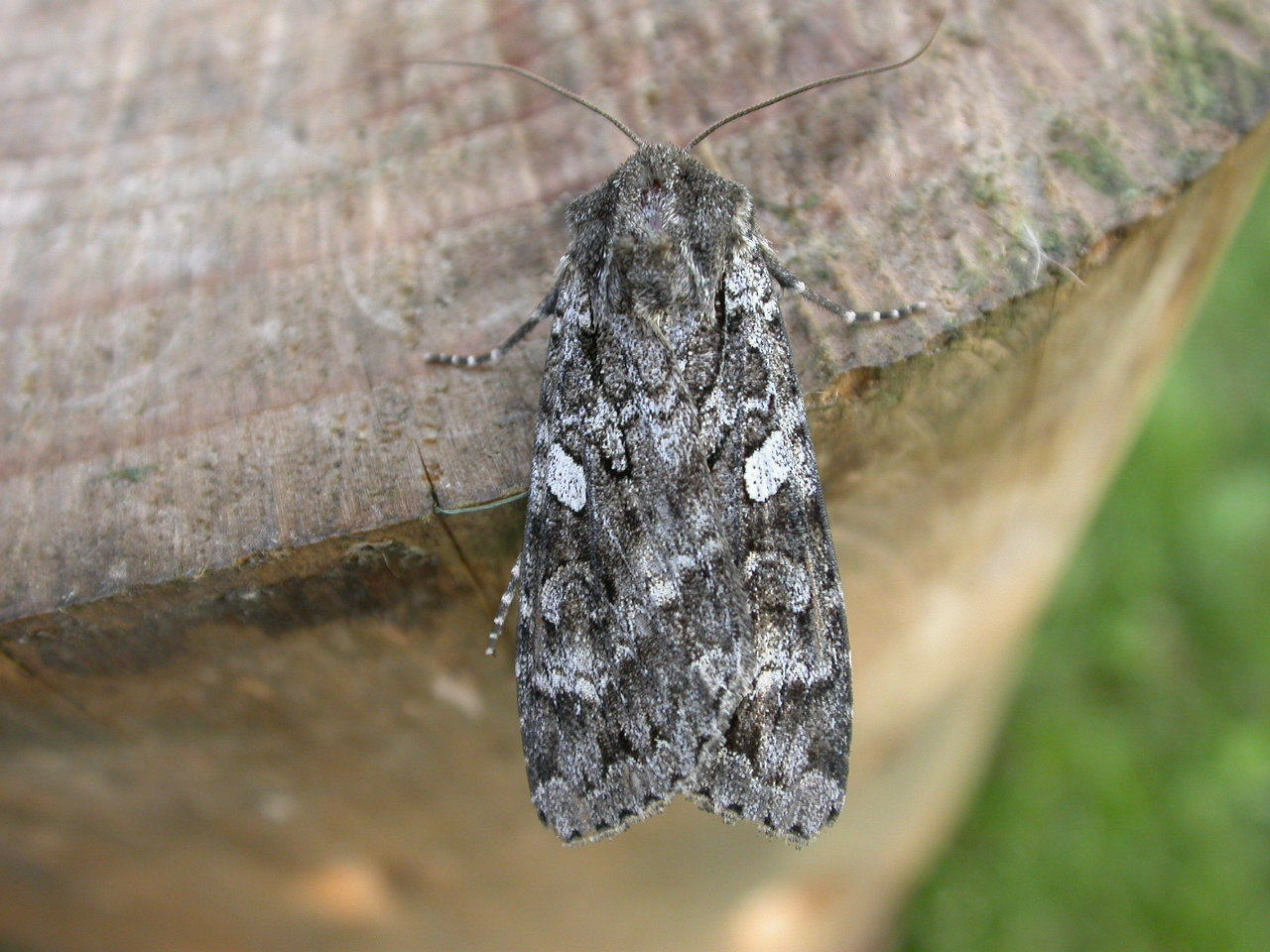

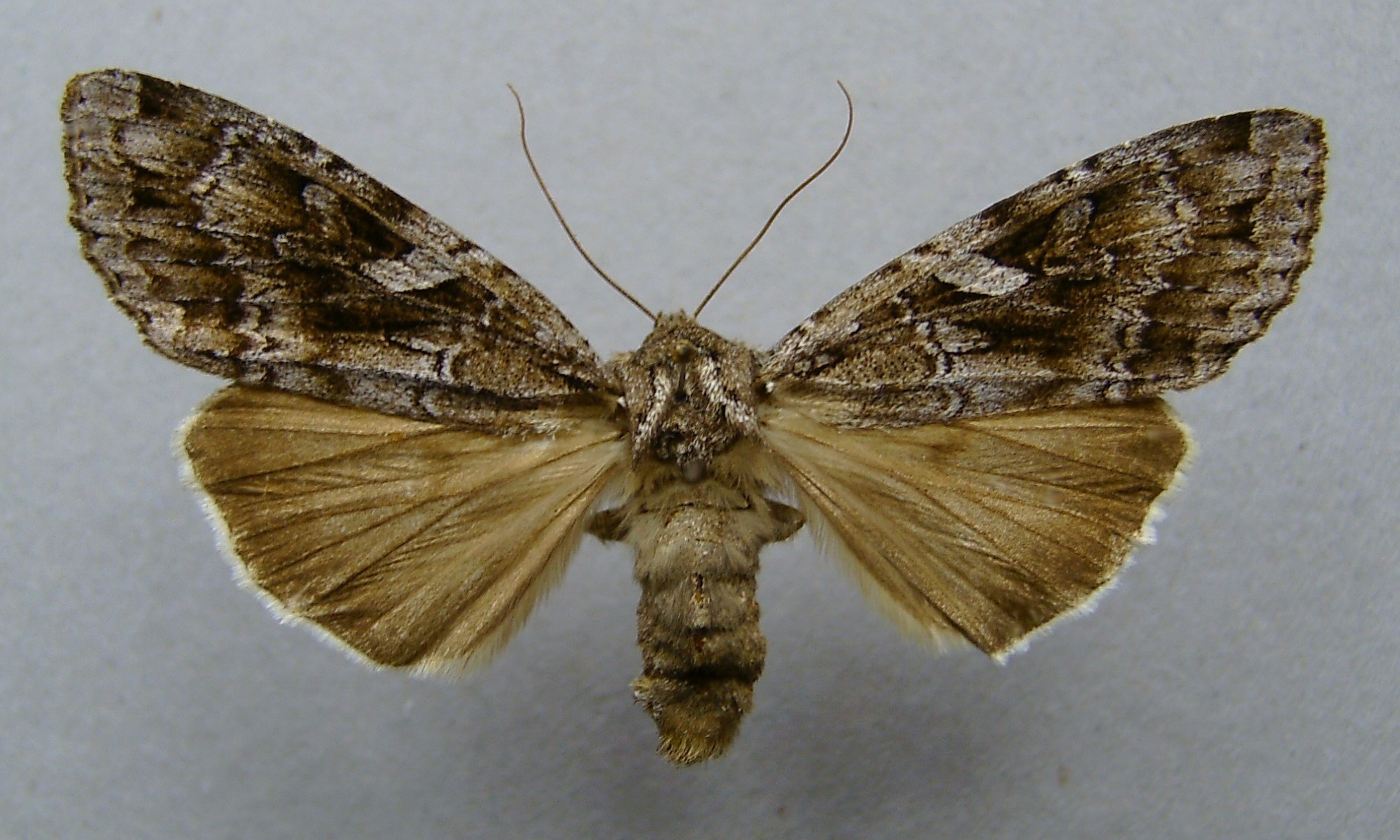

Scientific classification
- Kingdom: Animalia
- Phylum: Arthropoda
- Clade: Pancrustacea
- Class: Insecta
- Order: Lepidoptera
- Superfamily: Noctuoidea
- Family: Noctuidae
- Genus: Eurois
- Species: E. occulta

Binomial name
- Eurois occulta (Linnaeus, 1758)

= Eurois occulta =

Species of moth

Eurois occulta, the great brocade or great gray dart, is a moth of the family Noctuidae. It is found in northern and central Europe, North Asia and central Asia to the Pacific Ocean and Japan. Also the northern parts of North America (coast to coast in Canada, south in east to Virginia and the Great Lakes states) ( a Holarctic distribution). In addition, it is found in Greenland and Iceland. In the south in northern Spain and on the Balkan Peninsula.

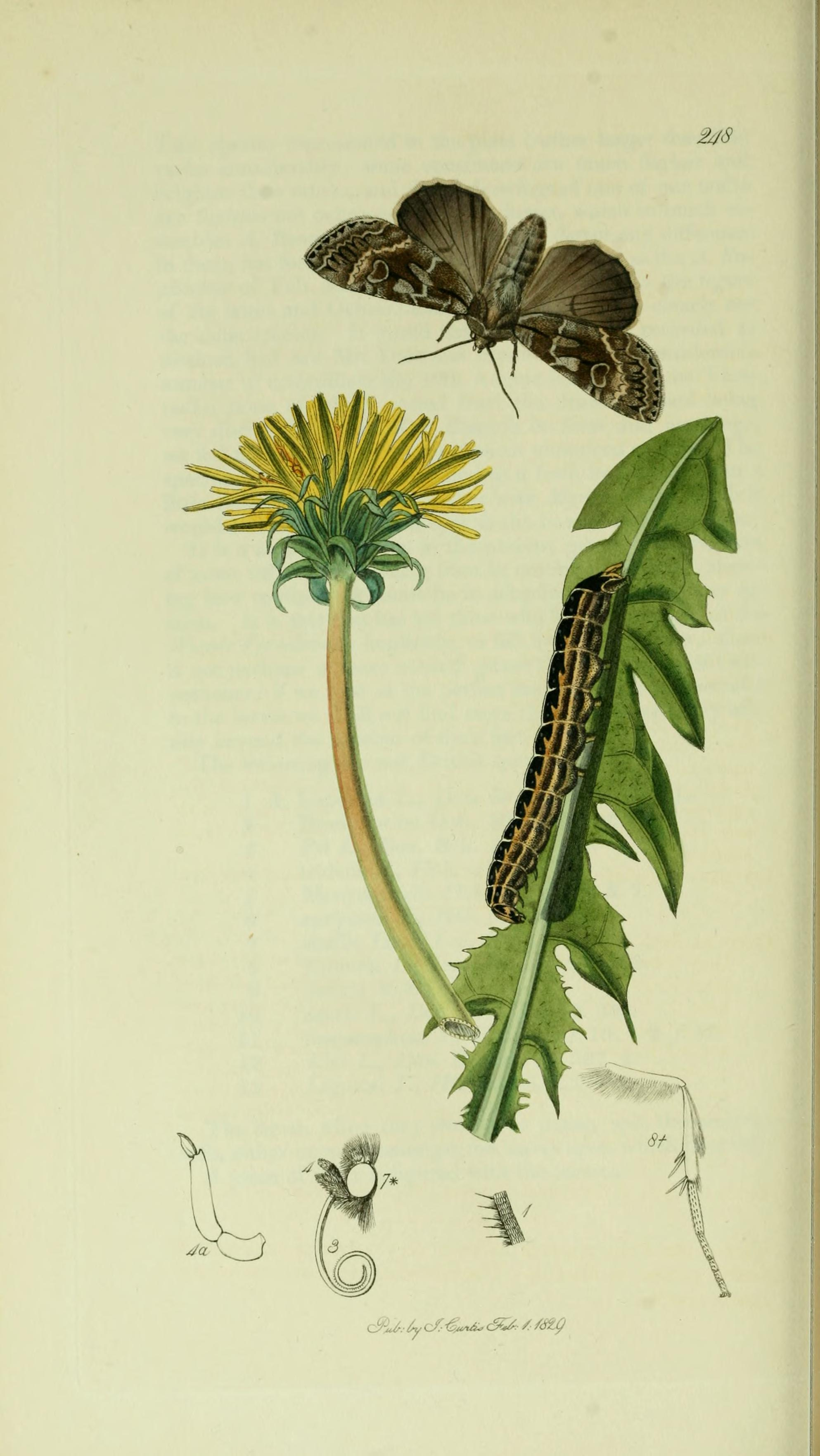
Illustration from John Curtis's British Entomology Volume 5

== Description ==
The wingspan is 50–60 mm. Forewing pale grey, more or less suffused with dark grey; a black streak from base below cell; stigmata large, grey, with black outlines, the cell dark: inner and outer lines filled in with whitish; submarginal line formed of large black and white teeth; hindwing fuscous, the fringe white. This fine species occurs - The form implicata is nearly black, a mountain form, found in Finland, on the Harz Mts. in Germany, and in Scotland. — ab. extricata Zett. from Lapland is an intermediate form.

It has been suggested, based partly on pupal remains in peat, that outbreaks of this species played a role in the collapse of Norse settlements in Greenland. These deposits at Anavik are now dried out and any potential evidence has been lost.

Larva brown, darker-mottled: dorsal and subdorsal lines yellowish; spiracular white; a series of oblique lateral dark stripes; on various low plants. The larvae feed on Myrica gale, Vaccinium, birch, willow and other herbaceous plants. .
