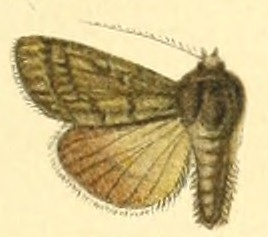

Scientific classification
- Domain: Eukaryota
- Kingdom: Animalia
- Phylum: Arthropoda
- Class: Insecta
- Order: Lepidoptera
- Superfamily: Noctuoidea
- Family: Noctuidae
- Genus: Rhyacia
- Species: R. quadrangula

Binomial name
- Rhyacia quadrangula (Zetterstedt, 1839)

Synonyms
- Agrotis quadrangula Zetterstedt, 1839; Agrotis rava Herrich-Schäffer, [1852]; Agrotis umbratus Packard, [1867]; Euxoa pallidifrons Hampson, 1903; Agrotis umbrata

= Rhyacia quadrangula =

Species of moth

Rhyacia quadrangula is a moth of the family Noctuidae. It is found in Iceland, central Asia, the Pamir Mountains, Greenland as well as Canada (Quebec, the Northwest Territories, Manitoba, Nova Scotia and Newfoundland and Labrador) and the north-western United States.

The wingspan is 36–38 mm. Adults are on wing from July to September.

The larvae feed on Gramineae species.
