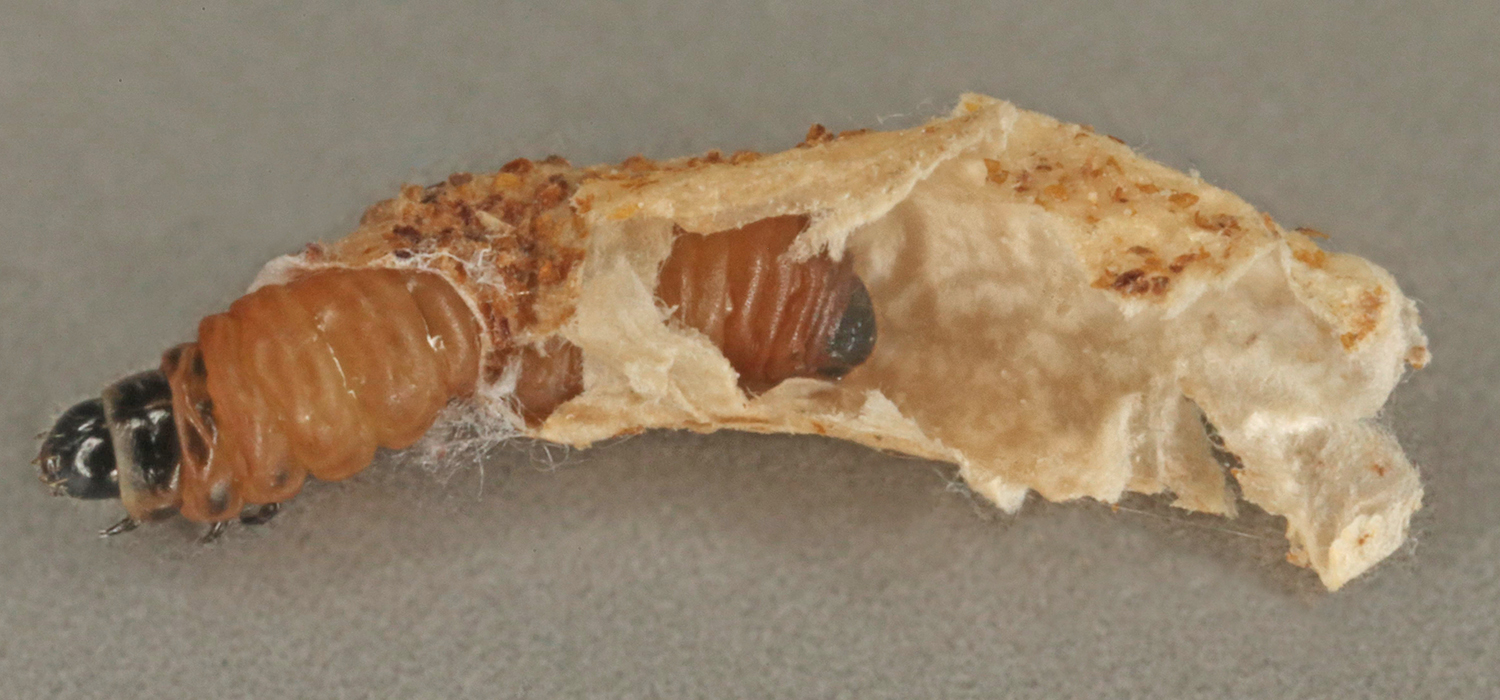

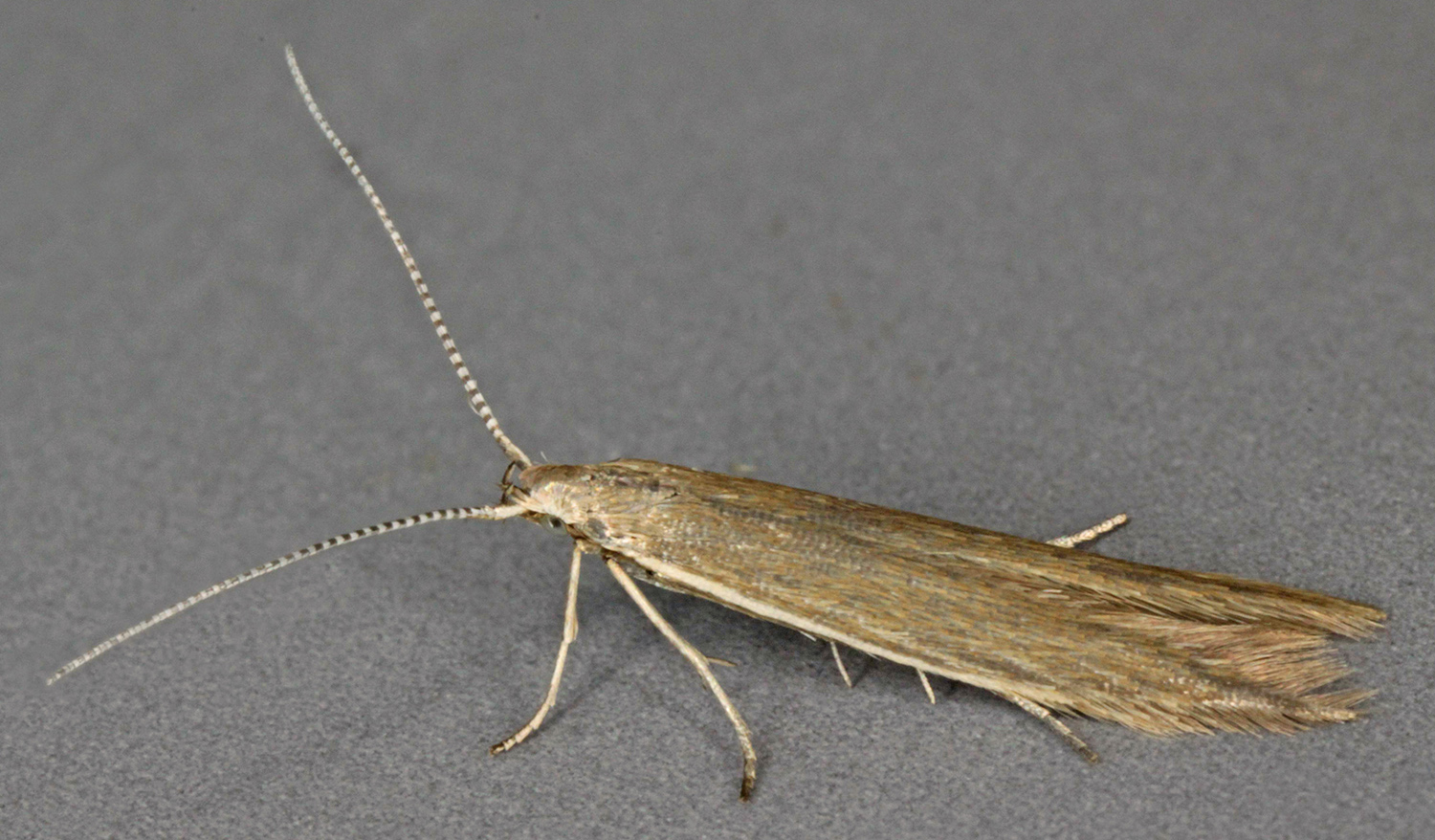
- Coleophora alticolella, Trawscoed, North Wales

Scientific classification
- Kingdom: Animalia
- Phylum: Arthropoda
- Class: Insecta
- Order: Lepidoptera
- Family: Coleophoridae
- Genus: Coleophora
- Species: C. alticolella

Binomial name
- Coleophora alticolella Zeller, 1849

= Coleophora alticolella =

Species of moth

Coleophora alticolella is a moth of the family Coleophoridae, found in Europe and North America.

== Descriptions ==
The wingspan is 10–12 mm. Head pale ochreous. Antennae white, ringed with light fuscous anteriorly except at apex. Forewings light yellow-ochreous; costa white to near apex; veins marked with fine whitish lines; costal cilia posteriorly pale yellow-ochreous, tips white. Hindwings grey.

Adults are on wing from June to July and possibly again from late April to May.

First generation larvae feed on the seedheads of rushes (Juncus species), woodrush (Luzula species) and club-rush (Scirpus species), while the second generation feeds on glasswort (Salicornia species). They create a whitish case with yellowish brown granules. It is about 6 mm long with a mouth angle of 0°-5°.

== Distribution ==
The moth is found in most of Europe (including Iceland) and is also known from North America.
