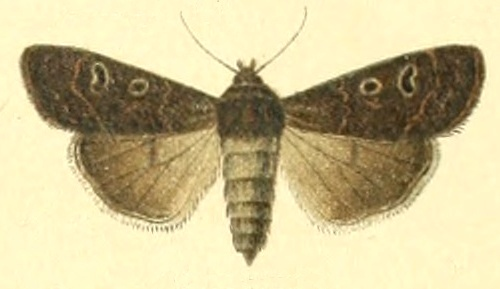

Scientific classification
- Kingdom: Animalia
- Phylum: Arthropoda
- Clade: Pancrustacea
- Class: Insecta
- Order: Lepidoptera
- Superfamily: Noctuoidea
- Family: Noctuidae
- Genus: Euxoa
- Species: E. adumbrata

Binomial name
- Euxoa adumbrata (Eversmann, 1842)

Synonyms
- Agrotis adumbrata Eversmann, 1842; Agrotis norvegica Staudinger, 1861; Agrotis polygonides Staudinger, 1874; Euxoa inexpectata; Euxoa lidia auct. nec Stoll, 1782; Euxoa drewseni (Staudinger, 1857); Agrotis drewseni Staudinger, 1857; Euxoa dreuseni Hampson, 1903; Porosagrotis thanatologia Dyar, 1904; Chorizagrotis sordida Smith, 1908; Chorizagrotis boretha Smith, 1908; Euxoa pseudovitta Boursin, 1959; Euxoa friedeli Pinker, 1980

= Euxoa adumbrata =

Species of moth

Euxoa adumbrata, the sordid dart, is a moth of the family Noctuidae. The species was first described by Eduard Friedrich Eversmann in 1842. In North America it is found across northern Canada from Quebec to western Alaska, south to the northern parts of the United States, and in the mountains to Colorado. It is also found in Greenland, the coastal areas of Scandinavia and the Ural. It was recently recorded from Denmark, although this includes Euxoa lidia, which some authors regard to be a valid species.

The wingspan is 34–40 mm (1.3–1.6 in). Adults are on wing from June to August in North America and from July to August in northern Europe. There is one generation per year.

The larvae feed on Taraxacum and Polygonum species.

== Subspecies ==
- Euxoa adumbrata drewseni (Staudinger, 1857)
- Euxoa adumbrata thanatologia (Dyar, 1904)
