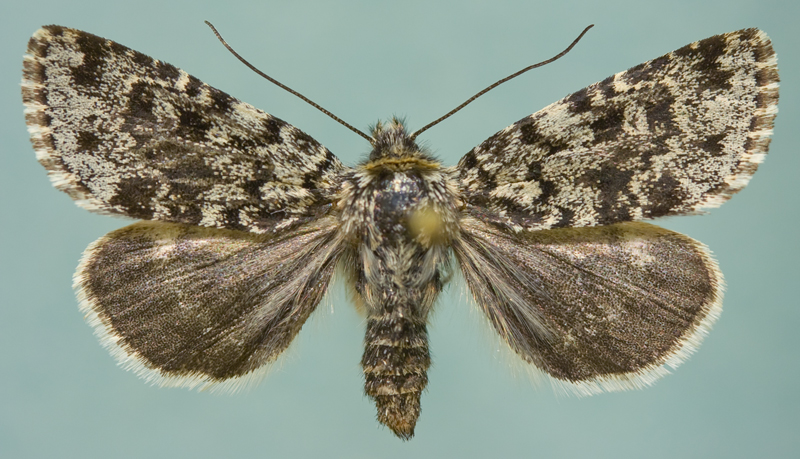

Scientific classification
- Domain: Eukaryota
- Kingdom: Animalia
- Phylum: Arthropoda
- Class: Insecta
- Order: Lepidoptera
- Superfamily: Noctuoidea
- Family: Noctuidae
- Genus: Sympistis
- Species: S. lapponica

Binomial name
- Sympistis lapponica (Thunberg, 1791)

Synonyms
- Noctua lapponica Thunberg, 1791; Anarta amissa Duponchel, 1836; Anarta tenebricosa Möschler, 1877

= Sympistis lapponica =

Species of moth

Sympistis lapponica is a moth of the family Noctuidae first described by Thunberg in 1791. It is found in Fennoscandia and northern Russia, Asia and northern North America.

The wingspan is 23–36 mm. The forewings are grey with black markings and chequered fringes. The hindwings are grey with a vague white line and white fringes. Adults are on wing from June to July.

The larvae feed on Vaccinium species (includingVaccinium myrtillus) and Betula nana. The species overwinters twice, once as an egg and the second time in the pupal stage.
