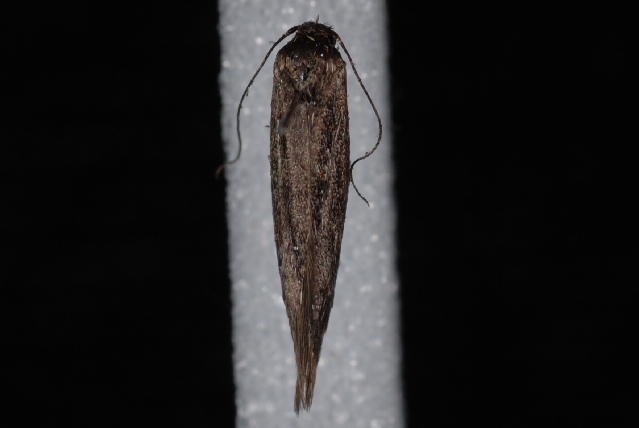

Scientific classification
- Kingdom: Animalia
- Phylum: Arthropoda
- Clade: Pancrustacea
- Class: Insecta
- Order: Lepidoptera
- Family: Scythrididae
- Genus: Scythris
- Species: S. noricella

Binomial name
- Scythris noricella (Zeller, 1843)

Synonyms
- Oecophora noricella Zeller, 1843; Scythris magnatella Busck, 1904; Scythris noricella latifoliella Wolff, 1964

= Scythris noricella =

Species of moth

Scythris noricella is a moth of the family Scythrididae. It was described by Philipp Christoph Zeller in 1843. It has a Holarctic distribution. In Europe, it is found on most of the continent, except Ireland, Great Britain, the Netherlands, Denmark, the Iberian Peninsula, the Baltic region and most of the Balkan Peninsula.

The wingspan is 18–22 mm. Adults are on wing from July to August. The larvae feed on Epilobium angustifolium.
