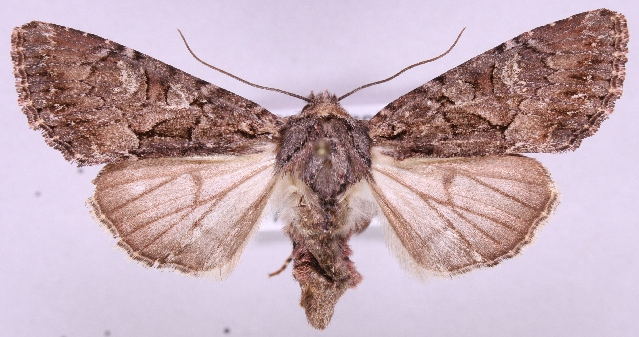

Scientific classification
- Domain: Eukaryota
- Kingdom: Animalia
- Phylum: Arthropoda
- Class: Insecta
- Order: Lepidoptera
- Superfamily: Noctuoidea
- Family: Noctuidae
- Genus: Mniotype
- Species: M. adusta

Binomial name
- Mniotype adusta (Esper, 1790)

Synonyms
- Phalaena (Noctua) adusta Esper, 1790; Phalaena (Noctua) adusta Esper, [1803]; Blepharita adusta; Noctua duplex Haworth, 1809; Noctua valida Hübner, [1813]; Hadena vultarina Freyer, 1832; Hadena chardinyi Duponchel, [1838]; Hadena pavida Boisduval, 1840; Hadena baltica Hering, 1846; Hadena adusta var. grisescens Standfuss, 1893; Hadena adusta var. carpathica Kaucki, 1922; Crino adusta lappona Rangnow, 1935; Mamestra vicina Alphéraky, 1882 (preocc. Mamestra vicina Grote, 1874); Hadena adjuncta Moore, 1881; Hadena adusta var. moesta Staudinger, 1897; Crino adusta urupino Bryk, 1942; Crino juldussica Draudt, 1934; Hadena moesta Staudinger, 1898; Hadena virgata Tutt, 1892

= Mniotype adusta =

Dark brocade

Species of moth

Mniotype adusta, the dark brocade, is a moth of the family Noctuidae. It was described by Eugenius Johann Christoph Esper in 1790. It is found throughout much of the Palearctic from Europe to Japan, China and Mongolia. It is also found in North America. The habitat consists of heathland, chalky downland, fenland, moorland and upland areas.

== Technical description and variation ==
The wingspan is 42–48 mm. Forewing rufous-brown clouded with darker; the veins black dotted with white; a slight black mark below base of cell, and a short black streak from inner margin near base; inner and outer lines blackish, double, forming black white-tipped teeth on the veins; claviform stigma blackish, acute, lying on a black streak joining the two lines; orbicular and reniform reddish grey edged with black, the reniform with some whitish in outer half; submarginal line white preceded by black wedge-shaped marks; hindwing of male whitish with the termen grey; the cellspot and veins dark; much greyer in female. Of general occurrence throughout Europe and in Asia found in Armenia, Asia Minor, W. and E. Siberia, W. and E. Turkestan and Tibet; - the form vulturina Frr., from S. Russia, has the forewing darker and variegated with white; - duplex Haw. is also a dark but unicolorous form, occurring in Scotland and the North of England; - sylvatica Bell is a grey, obscurely marked, insect without brownish tinge, from Corsica; - septentrionalis Hoffm. is a small black form from Finland, the Baltic provinces and the Ural Mts., of which moesta Stgr. from Dauria is possibly a synonym; - vicina Alph. from Central Asia is paler, more violet brown, with the markings clearly expressed; anilis Bsd. is whitish, thickly dusted with black, with no trace of red-brown tinge. See also nl wikipedia

== Subspecies ==
- Mniotype adusta adjuncta (Moore, 1881) (Nepal, Tibet, Pakistan, northern India)
- Mniotype adusta grisescens (Standfuss, 1893) (Corsica)
- Mniotype adusta moesta (Staudinger, 1898) (Russia)
- Mniotype adusta urupino (Bryk, 1942) (Kuriles)
- Mniotype adusta vicina (Alphéraky, 1882) (Mongolia, Turkmenistan, Tajikistan, China)
- Mniotype adusta virgata (Tutt, 1892) (Shetland Islands)

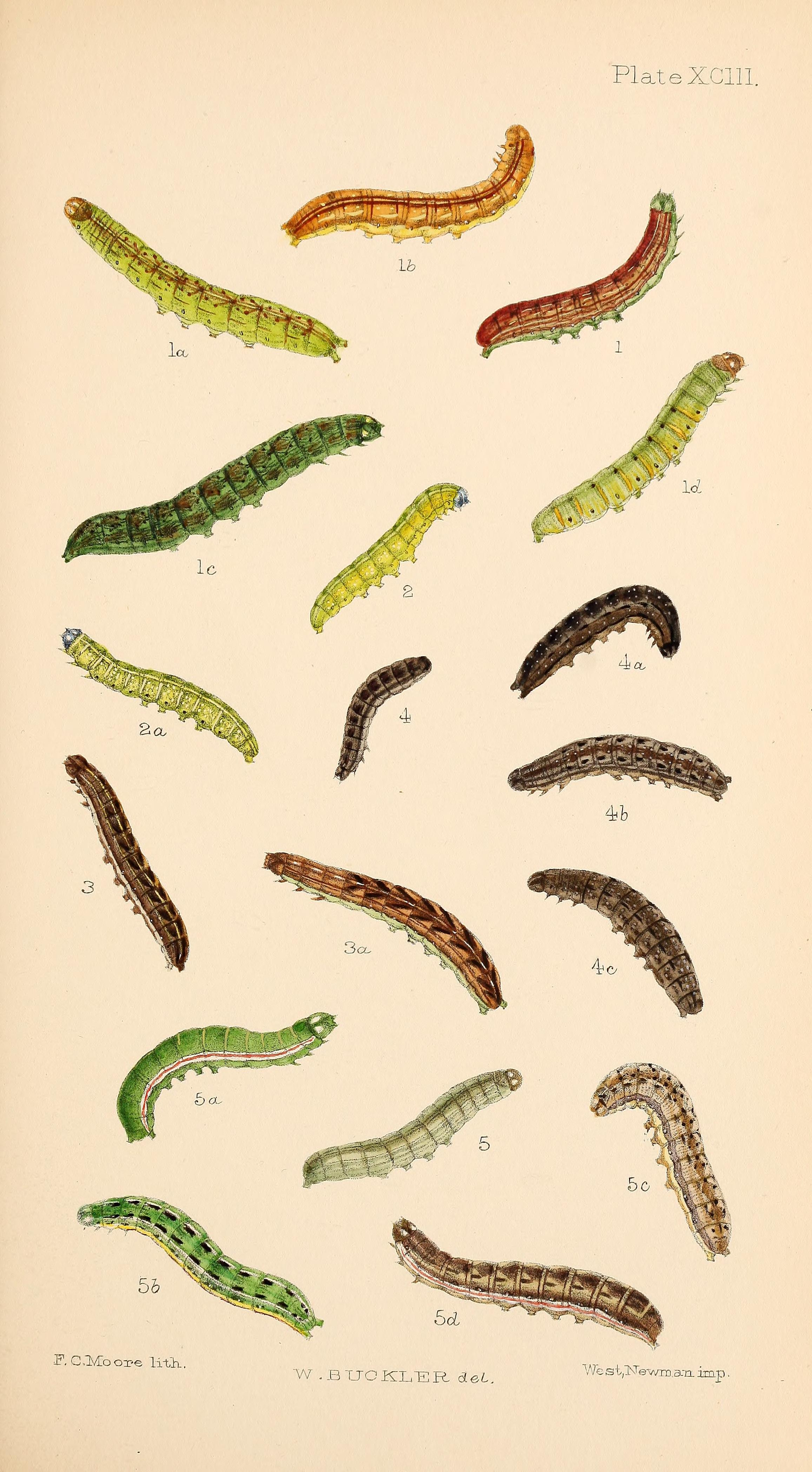
Figs.1, 1a, 1b, 1c, 1d larvae in various stages of growth

== Biology ==
Adults are on wing from May to July.

Larva grey green, suffused dorsally with reddish, with many small fine streaks; dorsal and subdorsal lines dark; spiracular line pale, whitish or yellowish; head greenish ochreous. The larvae feed on Sedum telephium, Calluna vulgaris, Vaccinium uliginosum, Solidago virgaurea, Artemisia vulgaris and Artemisia absinthium. Larvae develop from mid-June to early or mid-September. Pupation occurs in the spring.
