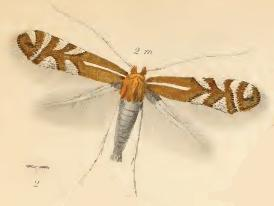

Scientific classification
- Kingdom: Animalia
- Phylum: Arthropoda
- Clade: Pancrustacea
- Class: Insecta
- Order: Lepidoptera
- Family: Gracillariidae
- Genus: Phyllonorycter
- Species: P. junoniella

Binomial name
- Phyllonorycter junoniella (Zeller, 1846)

Synonyms
- Lithocolletis junoniella Zeller, 1846

= Phyllonorycter junoniella =

Species of moth

Phyllonorycter junoniella is a moth of the family Gracillariidae. It is known from all of Europe, except Ireland, the Iberian Peninsula and the Balkan Peninsula.

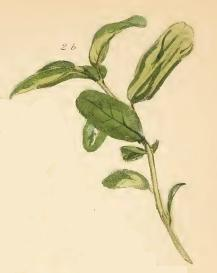
Mined leaf of Vaccinium vitis-idaea

Larva

The wingspan is 7–8 mm. There are two generations per year with adults on wing in June and July and again later in the autumn.

The larvae feed on Vaccinium vitis-idaea. They mine the leaves of their host plant.
