= Euxoa westermanni =

Scientific classification
- Domain: Eukaryota
- Kingdom: Animalia
- Phylum: Arthropoda
- Class: Insecta
- Order: Lepidoptera
- Superfamily: Noctuoidea
- Family: Noctuidae
- Tribe: Noctuini
- Subtribe: Agrotina
- Genus: Euxoa
- Species: E. westermanni

Binomial name
- Euxoa westermanni (Staudinger, 1857)

Species of moth

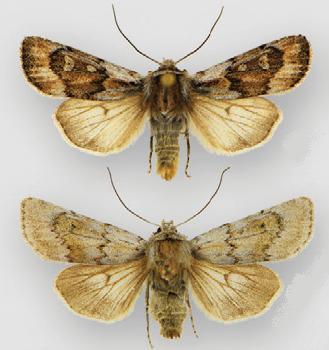

Euxoa westermanni is a species of cutworm or dart moth in the family Noctuidae. It is found in North America.

The MONA or Hodges number for Euxoa westermanni is 10707.

== Subspecies ==
These two subspecies belong to the species Euxoa westermanni:

- Euxoa westermanni polaris Bang-Haas, 1910
- Euxoa westermanni westermanni
