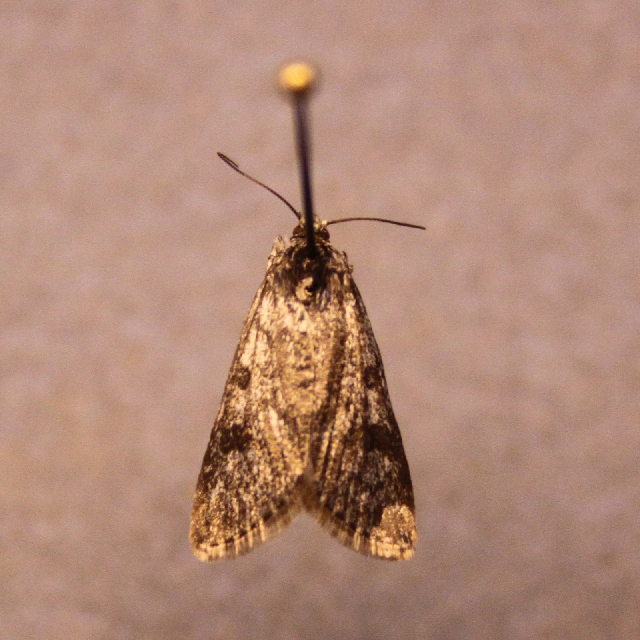

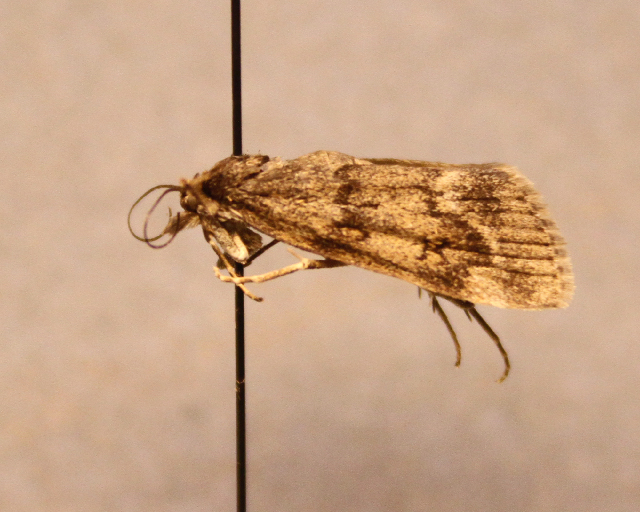

Scientific classification
- Domain: Eukaryota
- Kingdom: Animalia
- Phylum: Arthropoda
- Class: Insecta
- Order: Lepidoptera
- Family: Crambidae
- Genus: Udea
- Species: U. torvalis

Binomial name
- Udea torvalis (Möschler, 1864)

Synonyms
- Botys torvalis Möschler, 1864; Scoparia gelida McLachlan, 1878

= Udea torvalis =

Species of moth

Udea torvalis is a species of moth in the family Crambidae. It was first described by Möschler in 1864. It is found in North America, where it has been recorded from Labrador, Nunavut, the Northwest Territory and Yukon. It has also been recorded from Greenland and Russia.

The wingspan is 19–23 mm. The ground-colour of the wings is smoky blackish, rather silky, sprinkled with white scales. There are two darker transverse lines, the first inconspicuous, oblique and slightly angulate and the second distinct, oblique inwardly on the costal margin, then forming a very sharp curve outwardly, running inwardly almost longitudinally to within the level of the reniform spot, and then continued almost straight to the inner margin. It is bordered outwardly by white scales rather more densely placed than on the rest of the wing. The orbicular and reniform spots are dark, without pale centres. The orbicular is small, placed halfway between the first line and the reniform spot, the latter is larger, scarcely forming a solid 8-shape. Adults have been recorded on wing from June to August.
