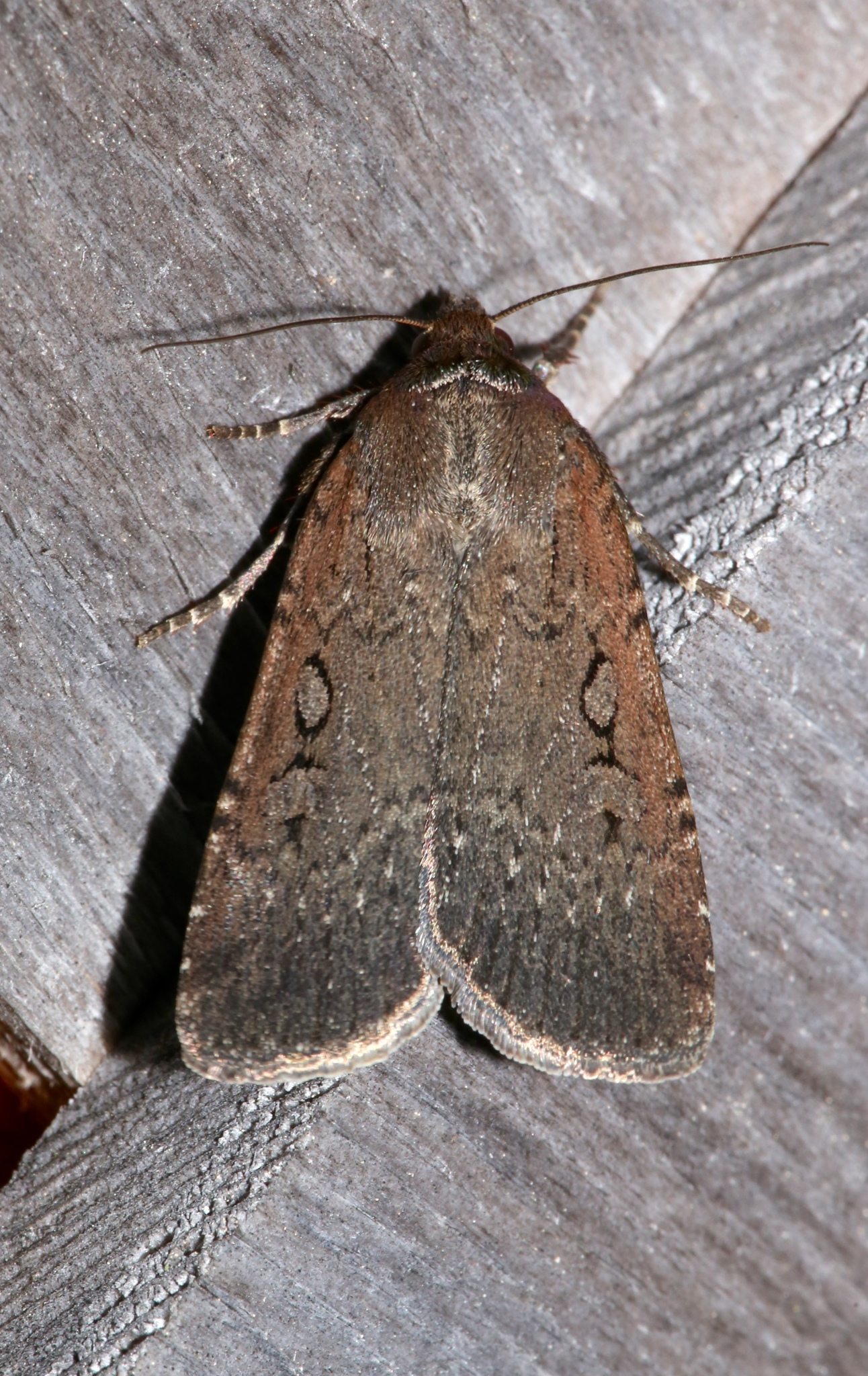

Scientific classification
- Domain: Eukaryota
- Kingdom: Animalia
- Phylum: Arthropoda
- Class: Insecta
- Order: Lepidoptera
- Superfamily: Noctuoidea
- Family: Noctuidae
- Genus: Spaelotis
- Species: S. clandestina

Binomial name
- Spaelotis clandestina (Harris, 1841)

Synonyms
- Noctua clandestina Harris, 1841; Mamestra unicolor Walker, 1856; Mamestra nigripes Walker, 1865

= Spaelotis clandestina =

Species of moth

The clandestine dart or w-marked cutworm (Spaelotis clandestina) is a moth of the family Noctuidae. It is found from coast to coast across Canada to southern Alaska, and in the eastern United States from Maine to western North Carolina, west to northern Ohio to North Dakota, South Dakota, Nebraska, and down the Rocky Mountains from Montana to southern Arizona.

The wingspan is about 38 mm. Adults are on wing from May to October.

The larvae are a pest on a variety of trees, shrubs, and herbaceous plants, including Vaccinium, Acer, Pinus, Fabaceae, Brassica oleracea, Zea mays, Malus and Fragaria.
