= List of Lepidoptera of Iceland =

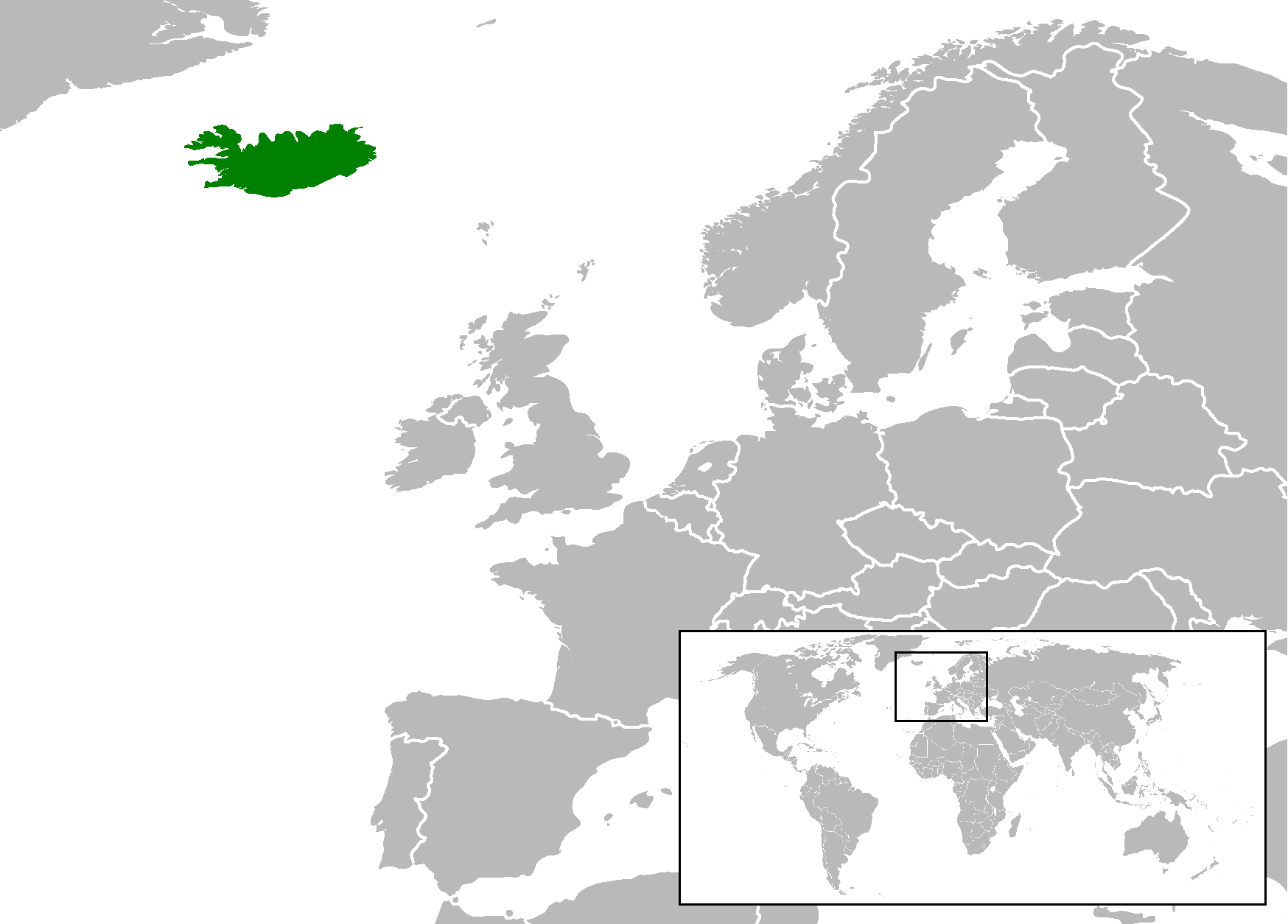
Location of Iceland

The Lepidoptera of Iceland consist of both the butterflies and moths recorded from Iceland.

== Butterflies ==
=== Nymphalidae ===
- Aglais io (Linnaeus, 1758)
- Aglais urticae (Linnaeus, 1758)
- Vanessa atalanta (Linnaeus, 1758)
- Vanessa cardui (Linnaeus, 1758)

=== Pieridae ===
- Pieris brassicae (Linnaeus, 1758)
- Pieris rapae (Linnaeus, 1758)

== Moths ==
=== Coleophoridae ===
- Coleophora algidella Staudinger, 1857
- Coleophora alticolella Zeller, 1849

=== Crambidae ===
- Crambus pascuella (Linnaeus, 1758)
- Gesneria centuriella (Denis & Schiffermuller, 1775)
- Nomophila noctuella (Denis & Schiffermuller, 1775)
- Udea ferrugalis (Hübner, 1796)

=== Erebidae ===
- Catocala fraxini (Linnaeus, 1758)
- Orgyia antiqua (Linnaeus, 1758)
- Scoliopteryx libatrix (Linnaeus, 1758)

=== Gelechiidae ===
- Bryotropha similis (Stainton, 1854)
- Gnorimoschema valesiella (Staudinger, 1877)
- Scrobipalpa atriplicella (Fischer von Röslerstamm, 1841)
- Scrobipalpa samadensis (Pfaffenzeller, 1870)
- Sitotroga cerealella (Olivier, 1789)

=== Geometridae ===
- Dysstroma citrata (Linnaeus, 1761)
- Entephria caesiata (Denis & Schiffermuller, 1775)
- Entephria flavicinctata (Hübner, 1813)
- Epirrhoe alternata (Muller, 1764)
- Erannis defoliaria (Clerck, 1759)
- Eupithecia nanata (Hübner, 1813)
- Eupithecia plumbeolata (Haworth, 1809)
- Eupithecia pusillata (Denis & Schiffermuller, 1775)
- Eupithecia satyrata (Hübner, 1813)
- Hydriomena furcata (Thunberg, 1784)
- Nycterosea obstipata (Fabricius, 1794)
- Operophtera brumata (Linnaeus, 1758)
- Perizoma blandiata (Denis & Schiffermuller, 1775)
- Perizoma minorata (Treitschke, 1828)
- Rheumaptera hastata (Linnaeus, 1758)
- Xanthorhoe decoloraria (Esper, 1806)
- Xanthorhoe designata (Hufnagel, 1767)

=== Momphidae ===
- Mompha conturbatella (Hübner, 1819)

=== Noctuidae ===
- Agrochola circellaris (Hufnagel, 1766)
- Agrotis ipsilon (Hufnagel, 1766)
- Agrotis segetum (Denis & Schiffermuller, 1775)
- Apamea exulis (Lefebvre, 1836)
- Autographa gamma (Linnaeus, 1758)
- Caradrina clavipalpis Scopoli, 1763
- Ceramica pisi (Linnaeus, 1758)
- Cerapteryx graminis (Linnaeus, 1758)
- Diarsia mendica (Fabricius, 1775)
- Eupsilia transversa (Hufnagel, 1766)
- Eurois occulta (Linnaeus, 1758)
- Euxoa ochrogaster (Guenee, 1852)
- Fabula zollikoferi (Freyer, 1836)
- Helotropha leucostigma (Hübner, 1808)
- Hydraecia micacea (Esper, 1789)
- Hypocoena stigmatica (Eversmann, 1855)
- Mniotype adusta (Esper, 1790)
- Mythimna unipuncta (Haworth, 1809)
- Noctua comes Hübner, 1813
- Noctua pronuba (Linnaeus, 1758)
- Parastichtis suspecta (Hübner, 1817)
- Peridroma saucia (Hübner, 1808)
- Phlogophora meticulosa (Linnaeus, 1758)
- Rhizedra lutosa (Hübner, 1803)
- Rhyacia quadrangula (Zetterstedt, 1839)
- Standfussiana lucernea (Linnaeus, 1758)
- Syngrapha interrogationis (Linnaeus, 1758)
- Xestia c-nigrum (Linnaeus, 1758)
- Xylena exsoleta (Linnaeus, 1758)
- Xylena vetusta (Hübner, 1813)

=== Oecophoridae ===
- Endrosis sarcitrella (Linnaeus, 1758)
- Hofmannophila pseudospretella (Stainton, 1849)

=== Plutellidae ===
- Plutella xylostella (Linnaeus, 1758)
- Rhigognostis senilella (Zetterstedt, 1839)

=== Pterophoridae ===
- Amblyptilia acanthadactyla (Hübner, 1813)
- Emmelina monodactyla (Linnaeus, 1758)
- Stenoptilia islandicus (Staudinger, 1857)

=== Pyralidae ===
- Ephestia elutella (Hübner, 1796)
- Ephestia kuehniella Zeller, 1879
- Matilella fusca (Haworth, 1811)
- Plodia interpunctella (Hübner, 1813)

=== Sphingidae ===
- Acherontia atropos (Linnaeus, 1758)
- Agrius convolvuli (Linnaeus, 1758)
- Hippotion celerio (Linnaeus, 1758)
- Hyles gallii (Rottemburg, 1775)
- Macroglossum stellatarum (Linnaeus, 1758)

=== Tineidae ===
- Monopis laevigella (Denis & Schiffermuller, 1775)
- Nemapogon variatella (Clemens, 1859)
- Tinea translucens Meyrick, 1917
- Tineola bisselliella (Hummel, 1823)

=== Tortricidae ===
- Acleris maccana (Treitschke, 1835)
- Acleris notana (Donovan, 1806)
- Apotomis sororculana (Zetterstedt, 1839)
- Cochylis dubitana (Hübner, 1799)
- Cydia pomonella (Linnaeus, 1758)
- Eana osseana (Scopoli, 1763)
- Epinotia caprana (Fabricius, 1798)
- Epinotia solandriana (Linnaeus, 1758)
- Lobesia littoralis (Westwood & Humphreys, 1845)
- Notocelia rosaecolana (Doubleday, 1850)
- Zeiraphera griseana (Hübner, 1799)
