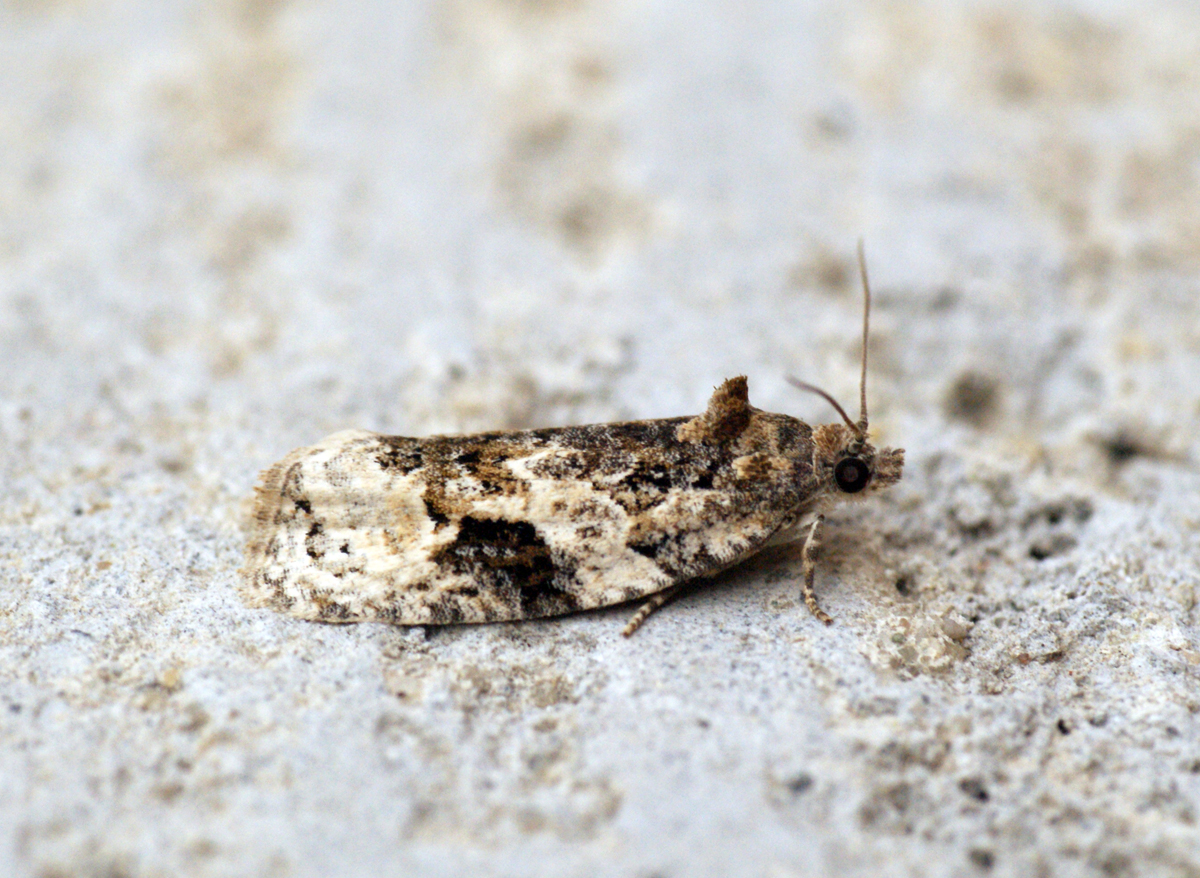

Scientific classification
- Domain: Eukaryota
- Kingdom: Animalia
- Phylum: Arthropoda
- Class: Insecta
- Order: Lepidoptera
- Family: Tortricidae
- Genus: Apotomis
- Species: A. lineana

Binomial name
- Apotomis lineana ([Denis & Schiffermüller], 1775)

= Apotomis lineana =

Species of moth

Apotomis lineana is a species of moth, belonging to the genus Apotomis.

It is native to Europe.
