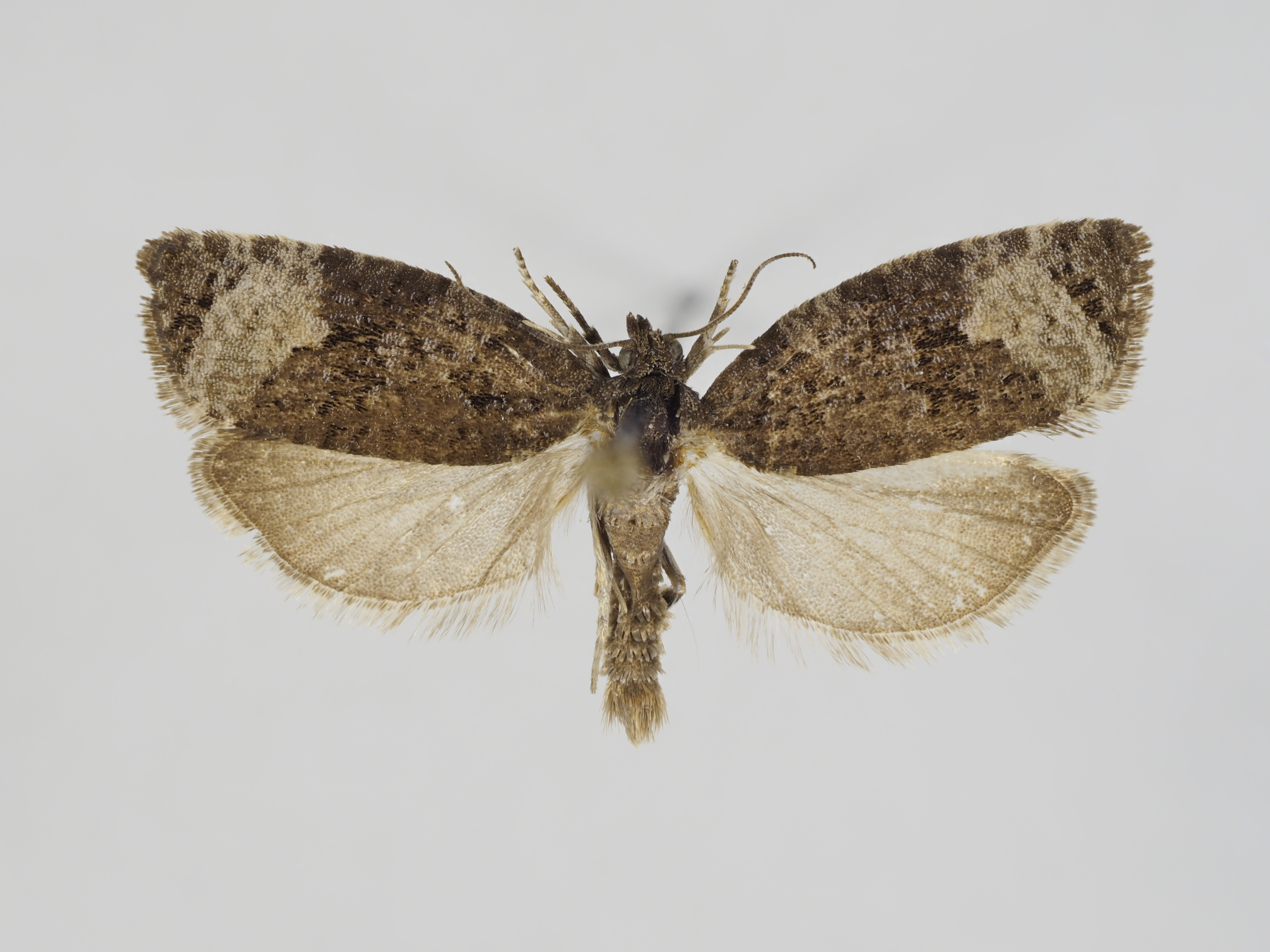

Scientific classification
- Kingdom: Animalia
- Phylum: Arthropoda
- Clade: Pancrustacea
- Class: Insecta
- Order: Lepidoptera
- Family: Tortricidae
- Genus: Apotomis
- Species: A. moestana

Binomial name
- Apotomis moestana (Wocke, 1862)

= Apotomis moestana =

Species of moth

Apotomis moestana is a species of moth belonging to the family Tortricidae.

It is native to Subarctic Europe.
