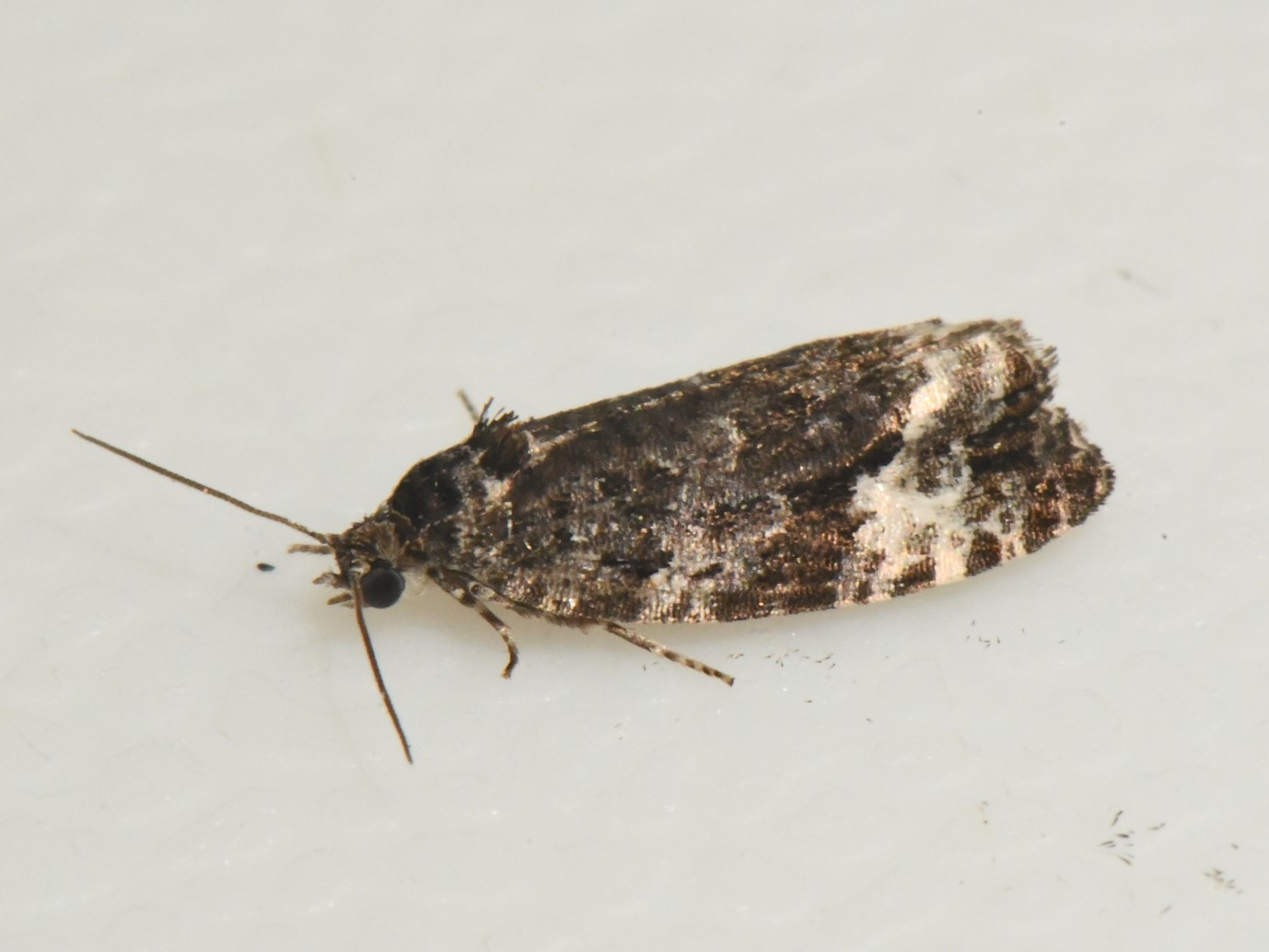

Scientific classification
- Kingdom: Animalia
- Phylum: Arthropoda
- Class: Insecta
- Order: Lepidoptera
- Family: Tortricidae
- Genus: Apotomis
- Species: A. afficticia

Binomial name
- Apotomis afficticia Heinrich, 1926

= Apotomis afficticia =

Species of moth

Apotomis afficticia is a species of moth belonging to the family Tortricidae. It can be identified from others in its genus by its forewing pattern and males can also be identified by their aedeagus being wider at the base.
