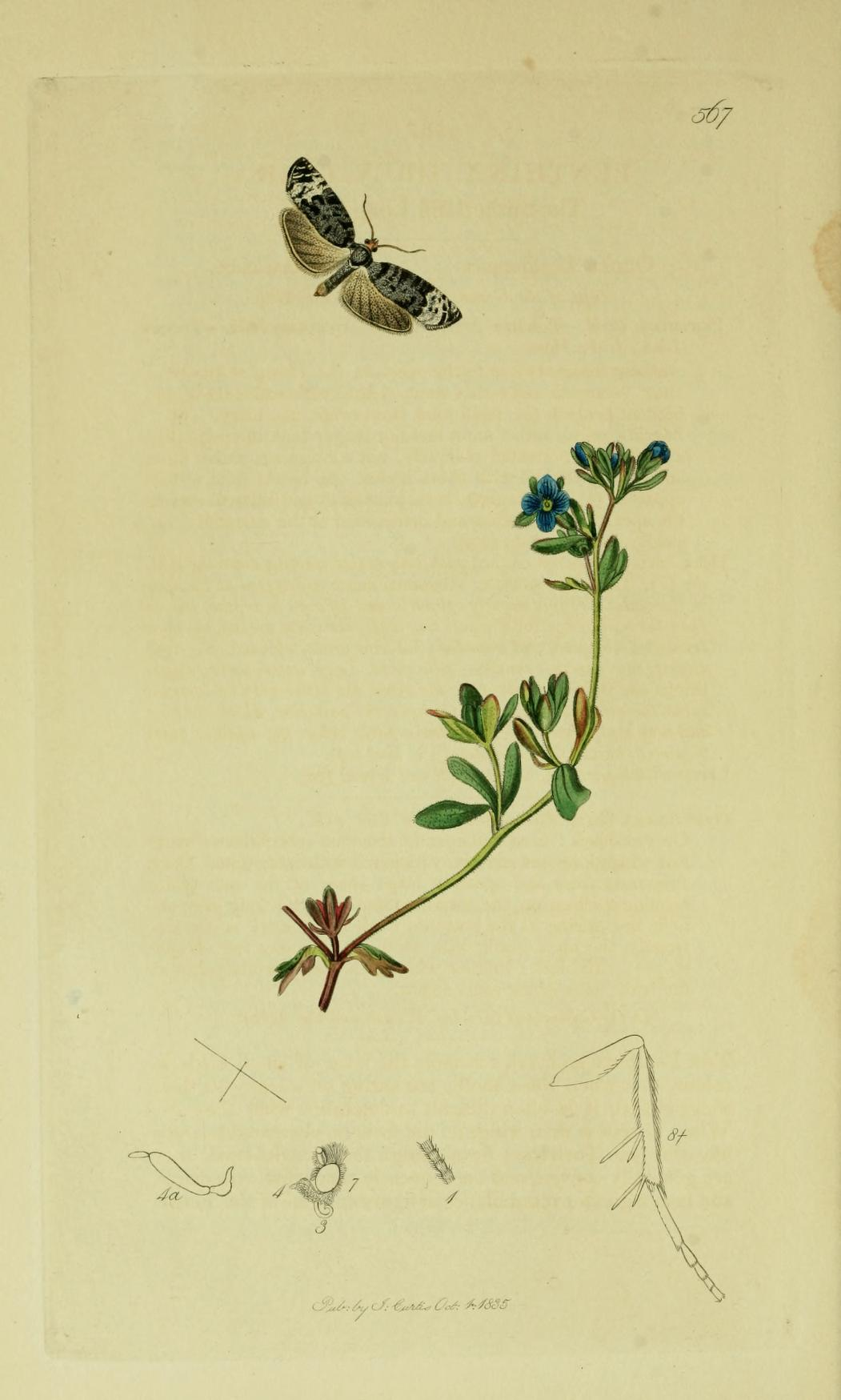
- Illustration from John Curtis's British Entomology Volume 6

Scientific classification
- Kingdom: Animalia
- Phylum: Arthropoda
- Clade: Pancrustacea
- Class: Insecta
- Order: Lepidoptera
- Family: Tortricidae
- Genus: Apotomis
- Species: A. sauciana

Binomial name
- Apotomis sauciana (Frölich, 1828)

Synonyms
- Tortrix sauciana Frölich, 1828; Apotomis sororculana f. boreana Krogerus, 1945; Penthina grevillana Curtis, 1835; Aphania sororculana kalaivamara Obraztsov, 1943; Antithesia staintoniana Barrett, 1872

= Apotomis sauciana =

Species of moth

Apotomis sauciana, the Sutherland long-cloak or Greville's marble, is a moth of the family Tortricidae. It is found in most of Europe, east to the eastern part of the Palearctic realm.

The wingspan is 13–16 mm. Adults are on wing from June to August. They fly during the afternoon and evening.

The larvae feed on Vaccinium myrtillus and Arctostaphylos species. They feed in spun shoots.

== Subspecies ==
- Apotomis sauciana sauciana
- Apotomis sauciana grevillana (Scotland)
