= Apotomis demissana =

Scientific classification
- Domain: Eukaryota
- Kingdom: Animalia
- Phylum: Arthropoda
- Class: Insecta
- Order: Lepidoptera
- Family: Tortricidae
- Genus: Apotomis
- Species: A. demissana

Binomial name
- Apotomis demissana (Kennel, 1901)

Species of moth

Apotomis demissana is a species of moth belonging to the family Tortricidae.

It is native to Subarctic Europe.
