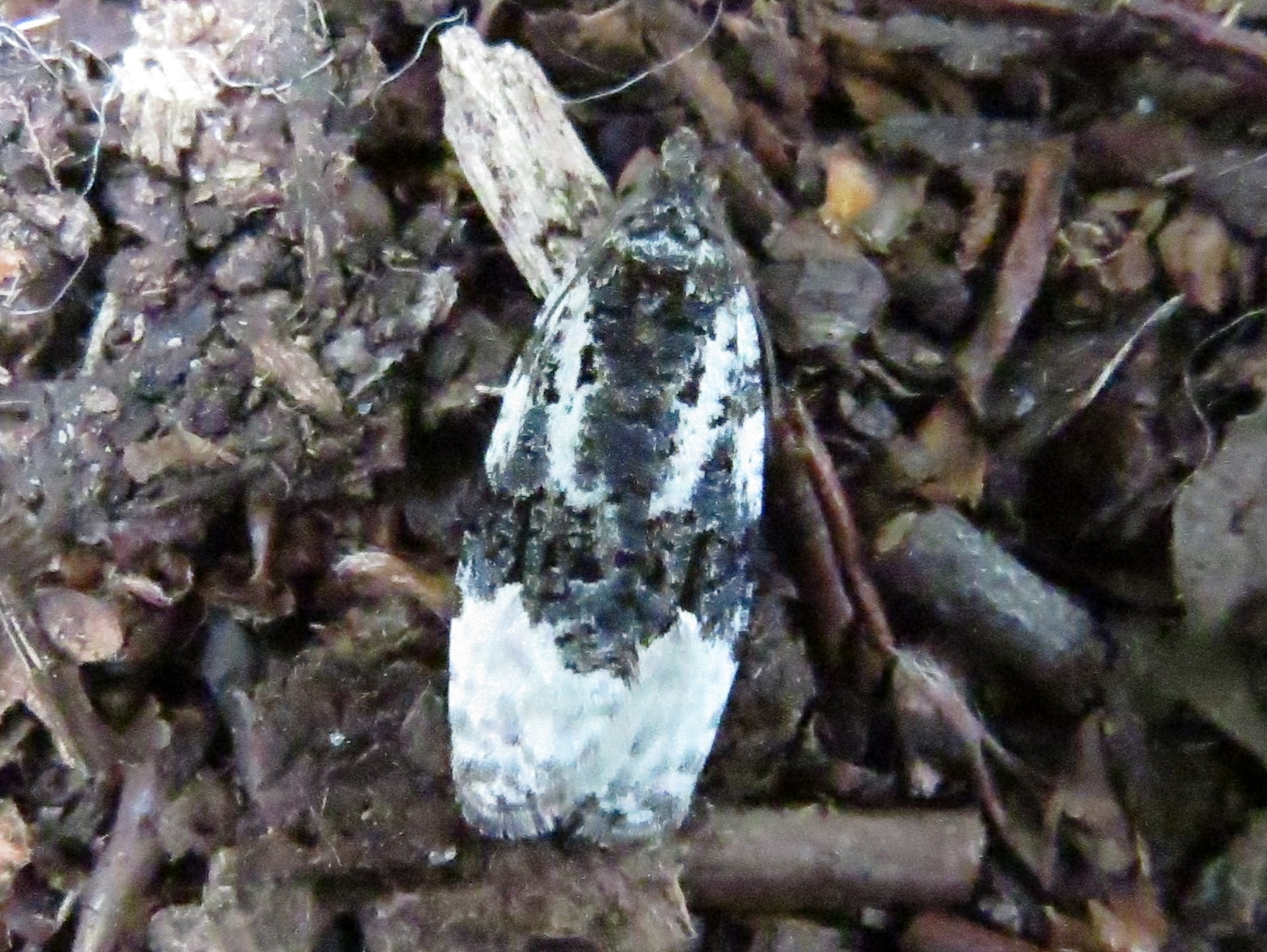

Scientific classification
- Kingdom: Animalia
- Phylum: Arthropoda
- Clade: Pancrustacea
- Class: Insecta
- Order: Lepidoptera
- Family: Tortricidae
- Genus: Apotomis
- Species: A. turbidana

Binomial name
- Apotomis turbidana Hübner, [1825]

= Apotomis turbidana =

Species of moth

Apotomis turbidana is a moth belonging to the family Tortricidae. The species was first described by Jacob Hübner in 1825.

It is native to the Palearctic.

The wingspan is 19–23 mm. The ground colour of the forewings is grey and black in the basal part, with irregular white spots. Near the apex there is a wide white cross-band so that the wing tip seems almost pure white. The hindwings are grey-brown.

This species is found both in forests and on moors. The larvae feed on Betula spp. The adult butterflies fly in June–July.
