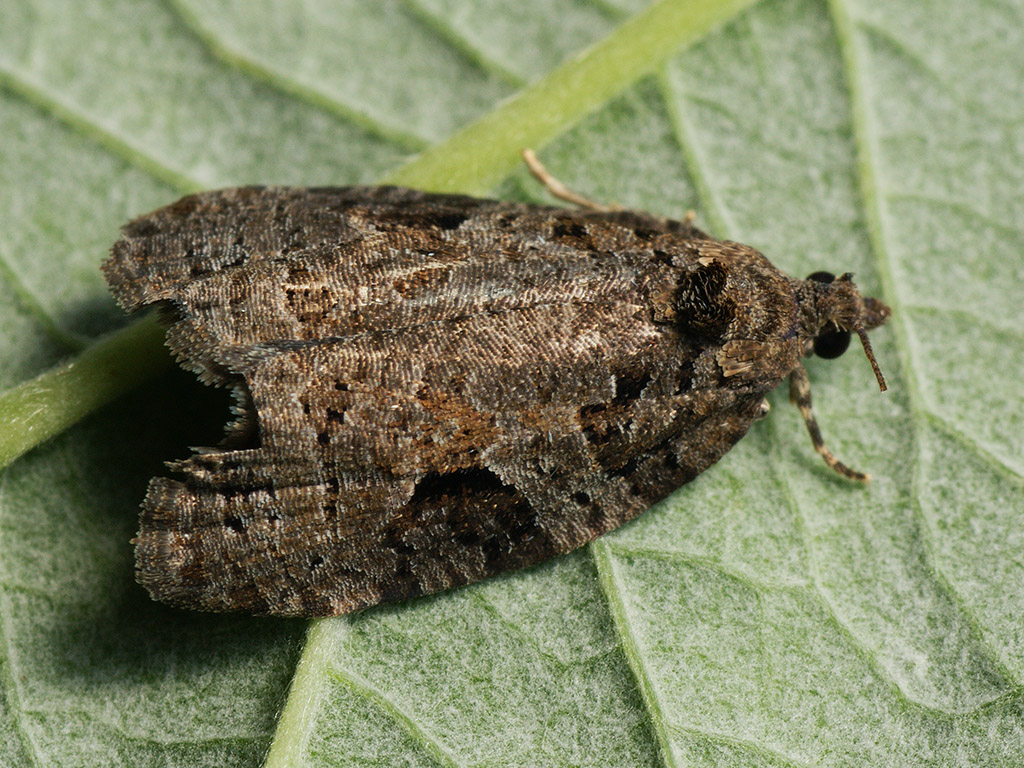

Scientific classification
- Domain: Eukaryota
- Kingdom: Animalia
- Phylum: Arthropoda
- Class: Insecta
- Order: Lepidoptera
- Family: Tortricidae
- Tribe: Olethreutini
- Genus: Apotomis; Hübner, [1825]

= Apotomis =

Genus of tortrix moths

Apotomis is a genus of moths belonging to the subfamily Olethreutinae of the family Tortricidae.

== Species ==
- Apotomis afficticia Heinrich, 1926
- Apotomis albeolana (Zeller, 1875)
- Apotomis algidana Krogerus, 1945
- Apotomis apateticana (McDunnough, 1922)
- Apotomis basipunctana (Walsingham, 1900)
- Apotomis betuletana (Haworth, [1811])
- Apotomis biemina Kawabe, 1980
- Apotomis bifida (McDunnough, 1938)
- Apotomis brevicornutana (McDunnough, 1938)
- Apotomis capreana (Hubner, [1817])
- Apotomis coloradensis Adamski in Adamski & Peters, 1986
- Apotomis cuphostra (Butler, 1879)
- Apotomis davisi Kawabe, 1993
- Apotomis deceptana (Kearfott, 1905)
- Apotomis demissana (Kennel, 1901)
- Apotomis flavifasciana (Kawabe, 1976)
- Apotomis formalis (Meyrick, in Caradja & Meyrick, 1935)
- Apotomis fraterculana Krogerus, 1945
- Apotomis frigidana (Packard, 1866)
- Apotomis funerea (Meyrick, 1920)
- Apotomis fuscomaculata Kawabe, 1993
- Apotomis geminata (Walsingham, 1900)
- Apotomis generosa (Meyrick, 1909)
- Apotomis infida (Heinrich, 1926)
- Apotomis inundana ([Denis & Schiffermuller], 1775)
- Apotomis jucundana Kawabe, 1984
- Apotomis kazarmana Falkovitsh, 1966
- Apotomis kusunokii Kawabe, 1993
- Apotomis lacteifacies (Walsingham, 1900)
- Apotomis lemniscatana (Kennel, 1901)
- Apotomis lineana ([Denis & Schiffermuller], 1775)
- Apotomis lutosana (Kennel, 1901)
- Apotomis moestana (Wocke, 1862)
- Apotomis monotona (Kuznetzov, 1962)
- Apotomis paludicolana (Brower, 1953)
- Apotomis platycremna (Meyrick, in Caradja & Meyrick, 1935)
- Apotomis removana (Kearfott, 1907)
- Apotomis sauciana (Frolich, 1828)
- Apotomis semifasciana (Haworth, [1811])
- Apotomis sororculana (Zetterstedt, 1839)
- Apotomis spinulana (McDunnough, 1938)
- Apotomis spiraeana (Kuznetzov, in Danilevsky, Kuznetsov & Falkovitsh, 1962)
- Apotomis spurinfida Adamski in Adamski & Peters, 1986
- Apotomis stagnana Kuznetzov, 1962
- Apotomis tertiana (McDunnough, 1922)
- Apotomis trifida Adamski in Adamski & Peters, 1986
- Apotomis trigonias Diakonoff, 1973
- Apotomis turbidana Hubner, [1825]
- Apotomis vaccinii Kuznetzov, 1969
- Apotomis vigens Falkovitsh, 1966

== See also ==
- List of Tortricidae genera
