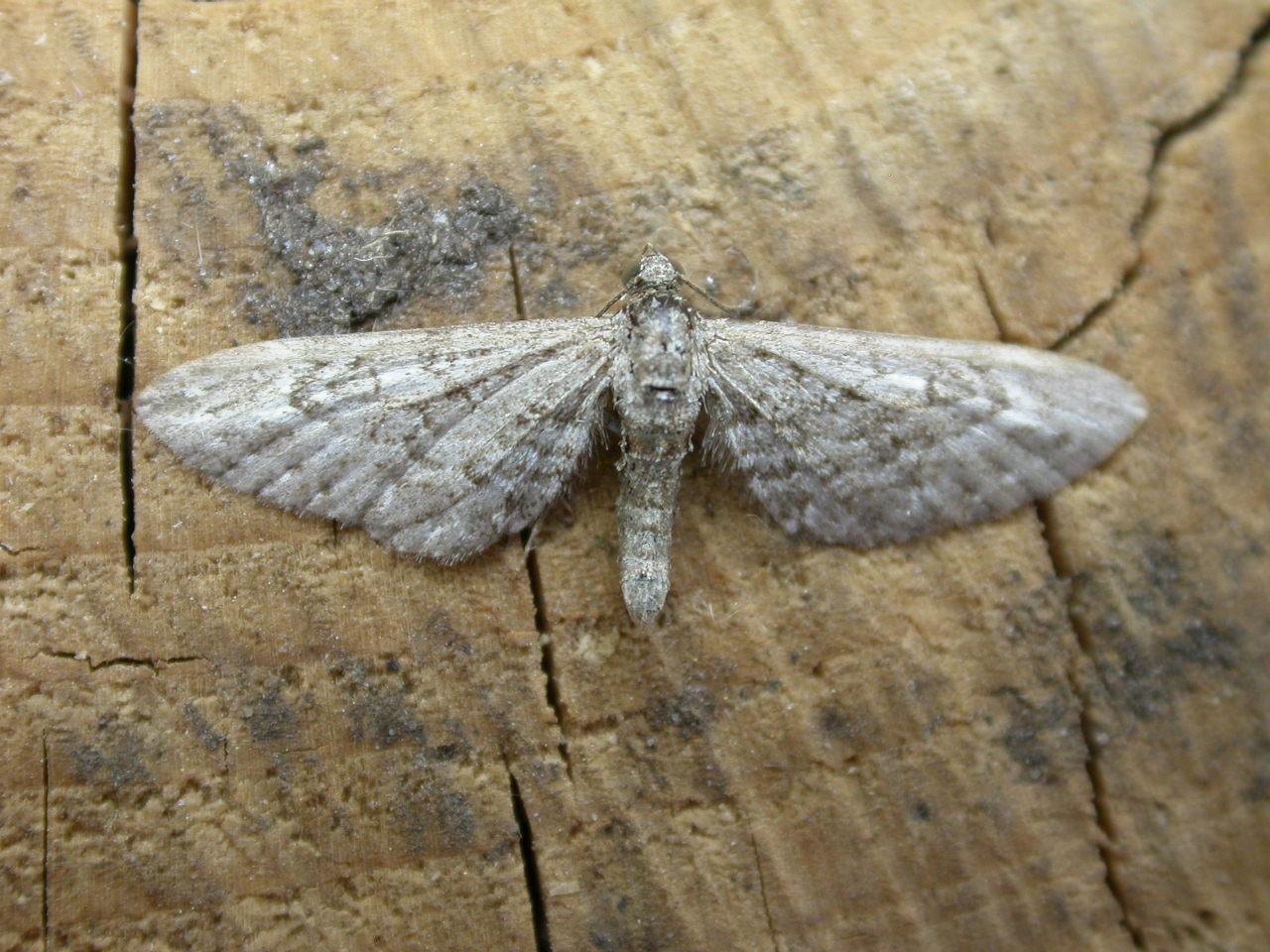

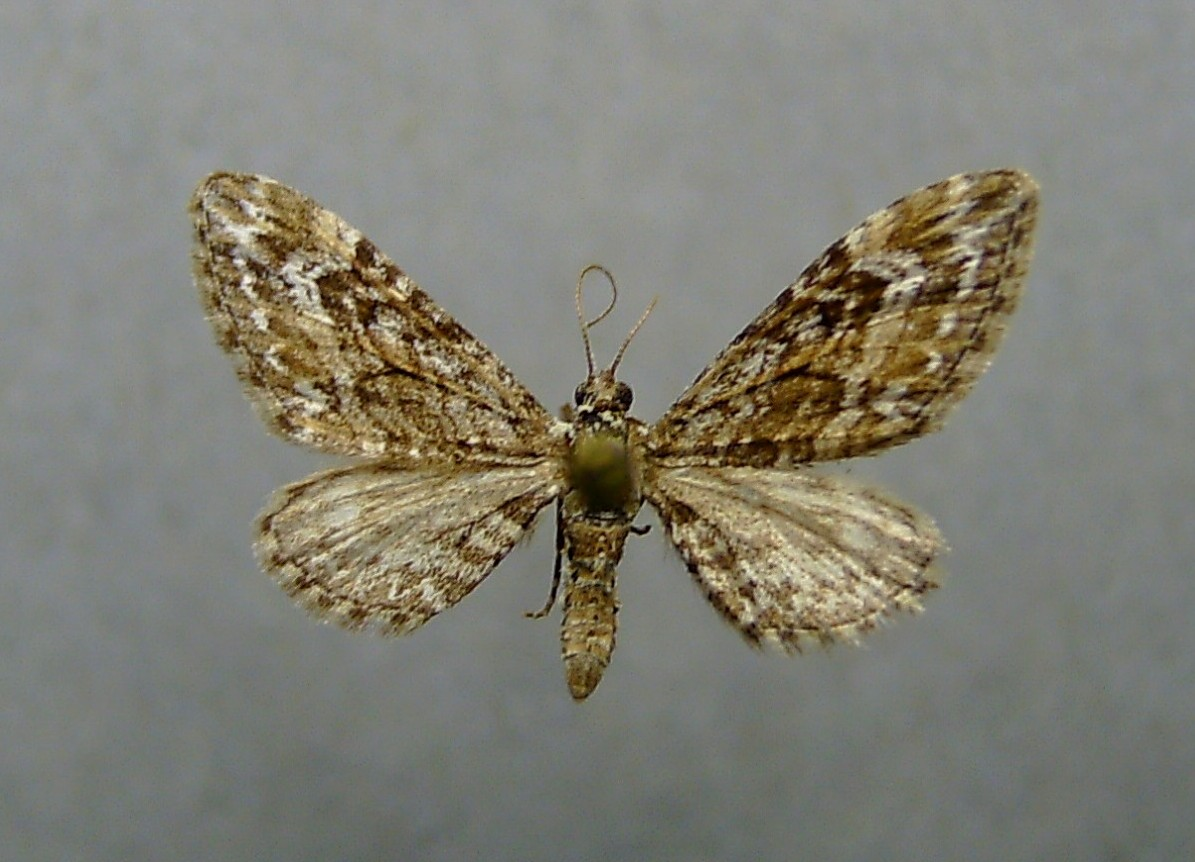

Scientific classification
- Kingdom: Animalia
- Phylum: Arthropoda
- Class: Insecta
- Order: Lepidoptera
- Family: Geometridae
- Genus: Eupithecia
- Species: E. nanata

Binomial name
- Eupithecia nanata (Hübner, 1813)

Synonyms
- Geometra nanata Hübner, 1813; Eupithecia angusta Prout, 1938; Phalaena angustata Haworth, 1809; Eupithecia zebrata Wolff, 1929

= Eupithecia nanata =

Species of moth

Eupithecia nanata, the narrow-winged pug, is a moth of the family Geometridae. The species was first described by Jacob Hübner in 1813. It can be found all over Europe including Russia (north to Kola Peninsula) and Ukraine. In the Alps it occurs up to 2,200 metres (7,200 ft) above sea level and in the Pyrenees to 2400 meters. The species prefers dry or boggy heathlands.

The wingspan is 13–17 millimetres (0.51–0.67 in). Eupithecia nanata is a variable species. The forewings are pointed. The ground colour of the forewings ranges from gray to brown to yellowish brown. In the midfield a contrasting dark lateral band sets itself apart: it initially runs at right angles from the costa. The black discal spot is sometimes unclear. There is a marginal white wavy line, which continues on the hindwings. These are partially paler than the forewings and have a small black discal spot. The fringes are brindled grey or brown and white. See also Prout. The caterpillars appear in two colour variations: at the beginning of the flowering of the food plant they have an alternating greenish and reddish colour with distinct reddish diamond-like spots on the back. The lateral stripes are white and interrupted. At the main flowering time of the food plants, the caterpillars show only a reddish and violet colour spectrum and are thus visually excellently protected from predators.

The moths fly from March to September depending on the location.

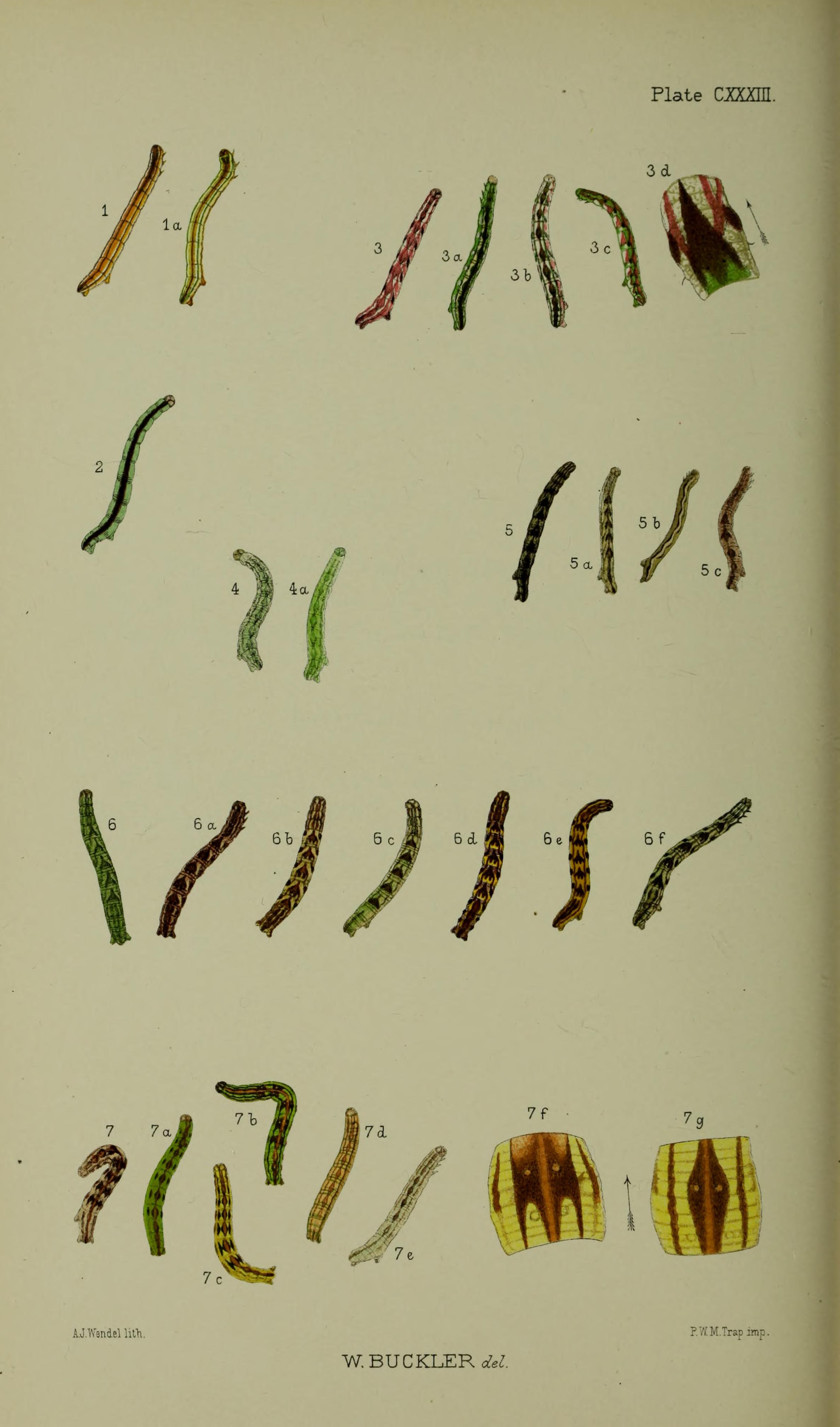
Fig.3,3a,3b,3c larvae after final moult 3d enlarged detail of segments

The larvae feed on Calluna species and sometimes Achillea millefolium.

== Subspecies ==
- Eupithecia nanata nanata
- Eupithecia nanata gelidatoides Warnecke, 1951 Iceland
- Eupithecia nanata zebrata Wolff, 1929 Faroe Islands
- Eupithecia nanata kozhantschikovi Wehrli, 1929 (raised to species status as Eupithecia kozhantschikovi)

== Etymology ==
The scientific name of the species is derived Latin nanus (meaning a dwarf).
