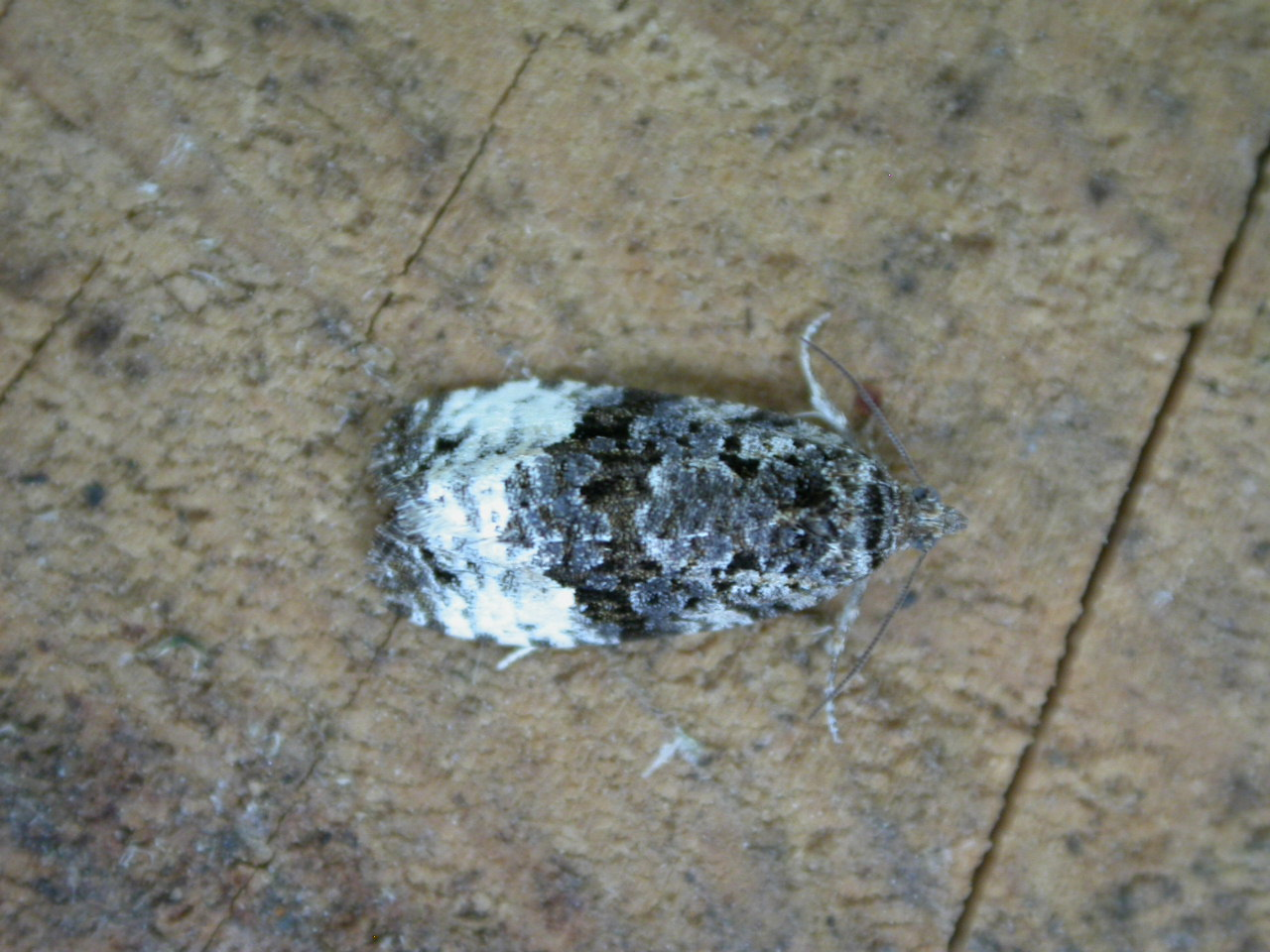

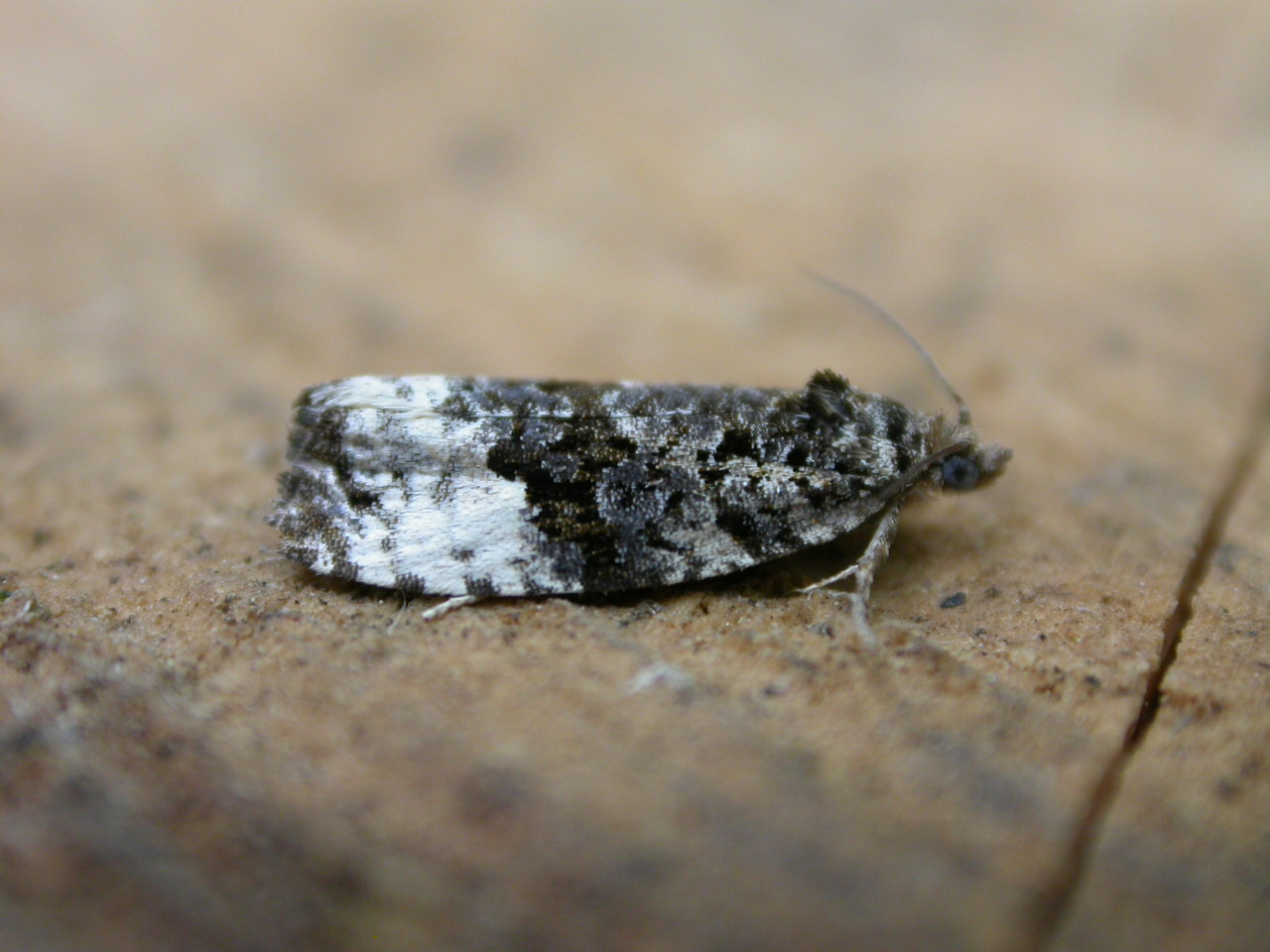

Scientific classification
- Domain: Eukaryota
- Kingdom: Animalia
- Phylum: Arthropoda
- Class: Insecta
- Order: Lepidoptera
- Family: Tortricidae
- Genus: Apotomis
- Species: A. sororculana

Binomial name
- Apotomis sororculana (Zetterstedt, 1839)

Synonyms
- Penthina sororculana Zetterstedt, 1839; Penthina praelongana Guenee, 1845

= Apotomis sororculana =

Species of moth

Apotomis sororculana is a moth of the family Tortricidae. It is found in most of Europe, and in the eastern part of the Palearctic realm.

The wingspan is 17–20 mm. The forewings are narrower than in Apotomis betuletana, white, sometimes partly ochreous- tinged, posteriorly with thick grey striae. The basal patch, central fascia, and the included space are brown much spotted with black, somewhat mixed with white, especially on space towards costa> The posterior edge of the fascia slightly concave, with two prominences on lower half. There is a brown terminal streak from apex, preceded by several black dots. The hindwings are light grey, darker terminally. Julius von Kennel provides a full description.

Adults are on wing from May to July.

The larvae feed on Betula species. They live between two leaves spun together.
