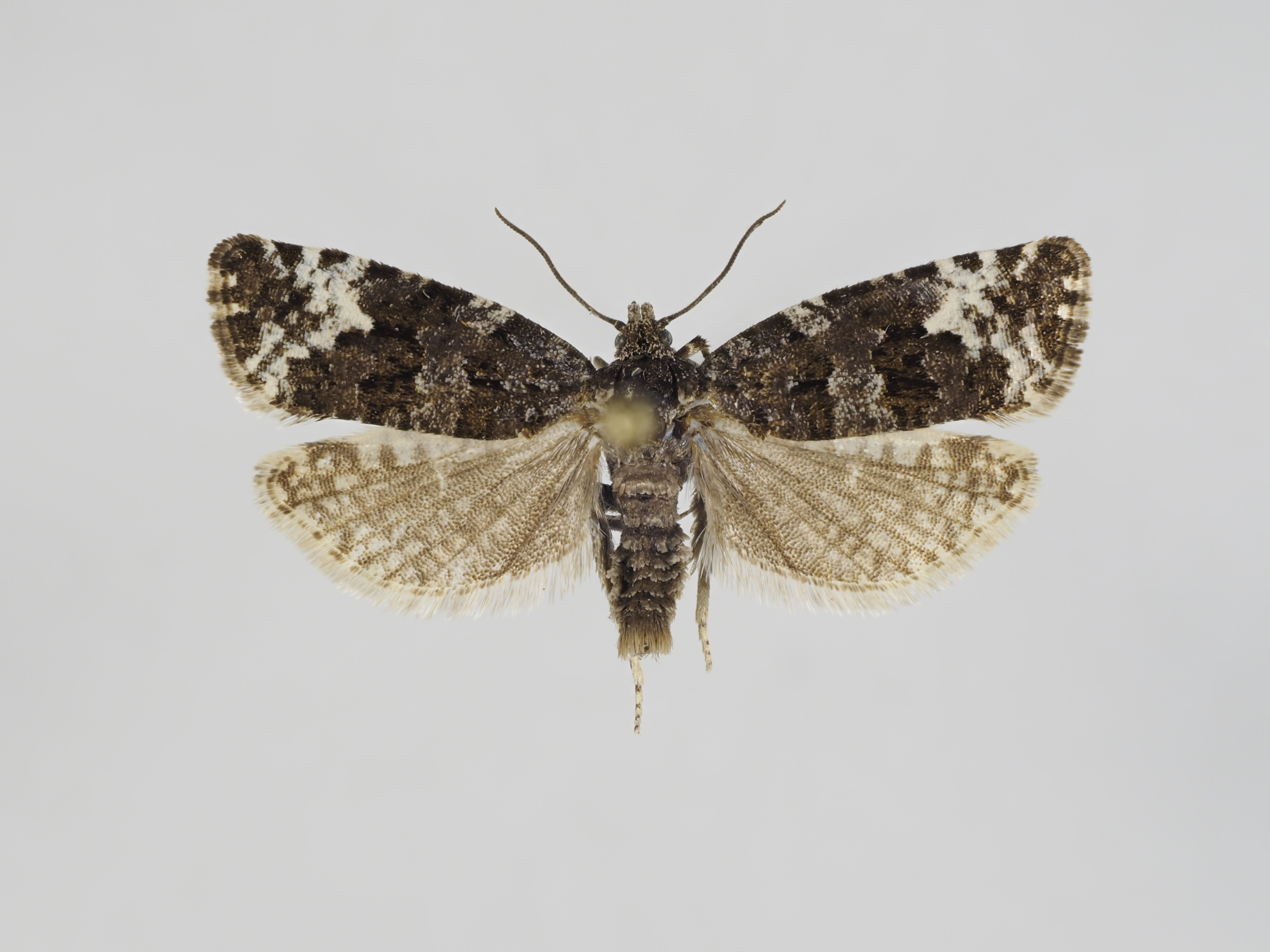

Scientific classification
- Domain: Eukaryota
- Kingdom: Animalia
- Phylum: Arthropoda
- Class: Insecta
- Order: Lepidoptera
- Family: Tortricidae
- Genus: Apotomis
- Species: A. lemniscatana

Binomial name
- Apotomis lemniscatana (Kennel, 1901)

= Apotomis lemniscatana =

Species of moth

Apotomis lemniscatana is a species of moth belonging to the family Tortricidae.

It is native to Northern Europe.
