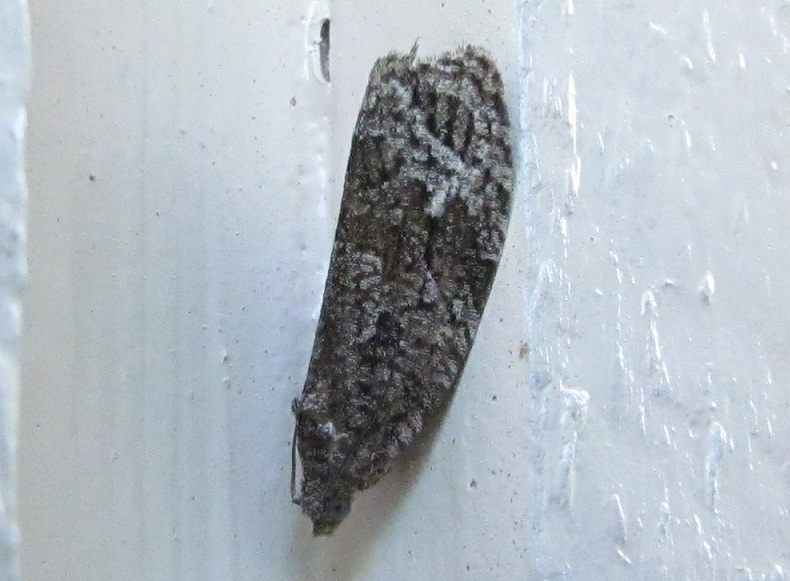

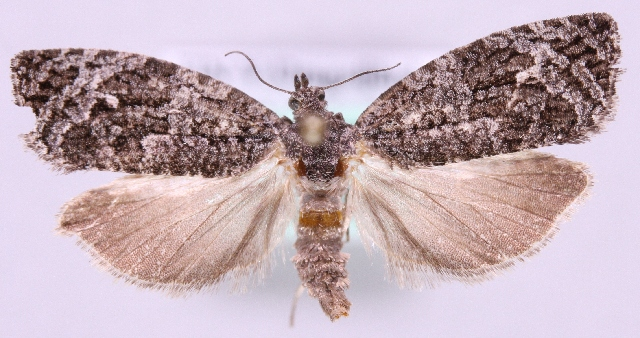

Scientific classification
- Domain: Eukaryota
- Kingdom: Animalia
- Phylum: Arthropoda
- Class: Insecta
- Order: Lepidoptera
- Family: Tortricidae
- Genus: Apotomis
- Species: A. inundana

Binomial name
- Apotomis inundana (Denis & Schiffermüller, 1775)

Synonyms
- Tortrix inundana [Denis & Schiffermuller], 1775

= Apotomis inundana =

Species of moth

Apotomis inundana is a moth of the family Tortricidae. It is found from Fennoscandia to Italy, Bosnia and Herzegovina, Hungary and Romania and from Belgium and Switzerland to the Baltic region and Russia.

The wingspan is 20–22 mm. Adults are on wing from June to August.

The larvae feed on Populus tremula.
