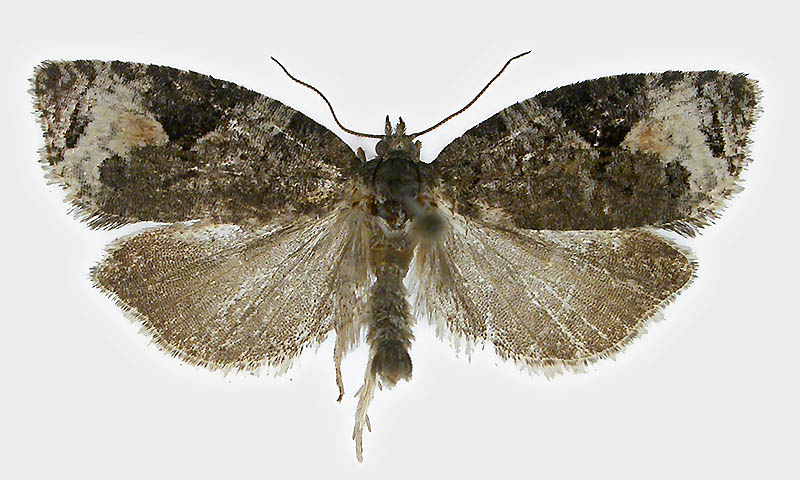

Scientific classification
- Domain: Eukaryota
- Kingdom: Animalia
- Phylum: Arthropoda
- Class: Insecta
- Order: Lepidoptera
- Family: Tortricidae
- Genus: Apotomis
- Species: A. infida

Binomial name
- Apotomis infida (Heinrich, 1926)

Synonyms
- Aphania infida Heinrich, 1926

= Apotomis infida =

Species of moth

Apotomis infida is a moth of the family Tortricidae. It is found from Great Britain east to Russia and from Fennoscandia south to France, Italy and Slovakia. It is also found in North America, where it has been recorded from Michigan, Ontario, Quebec, Alberta, British Columbia, California and Colorado.

The wingspan is 17–19 mm. Adults are on wing from June to August in North America.

The larvae feed on various Salix species, including Salix purpurea, Salix alba, Salix triandra.
