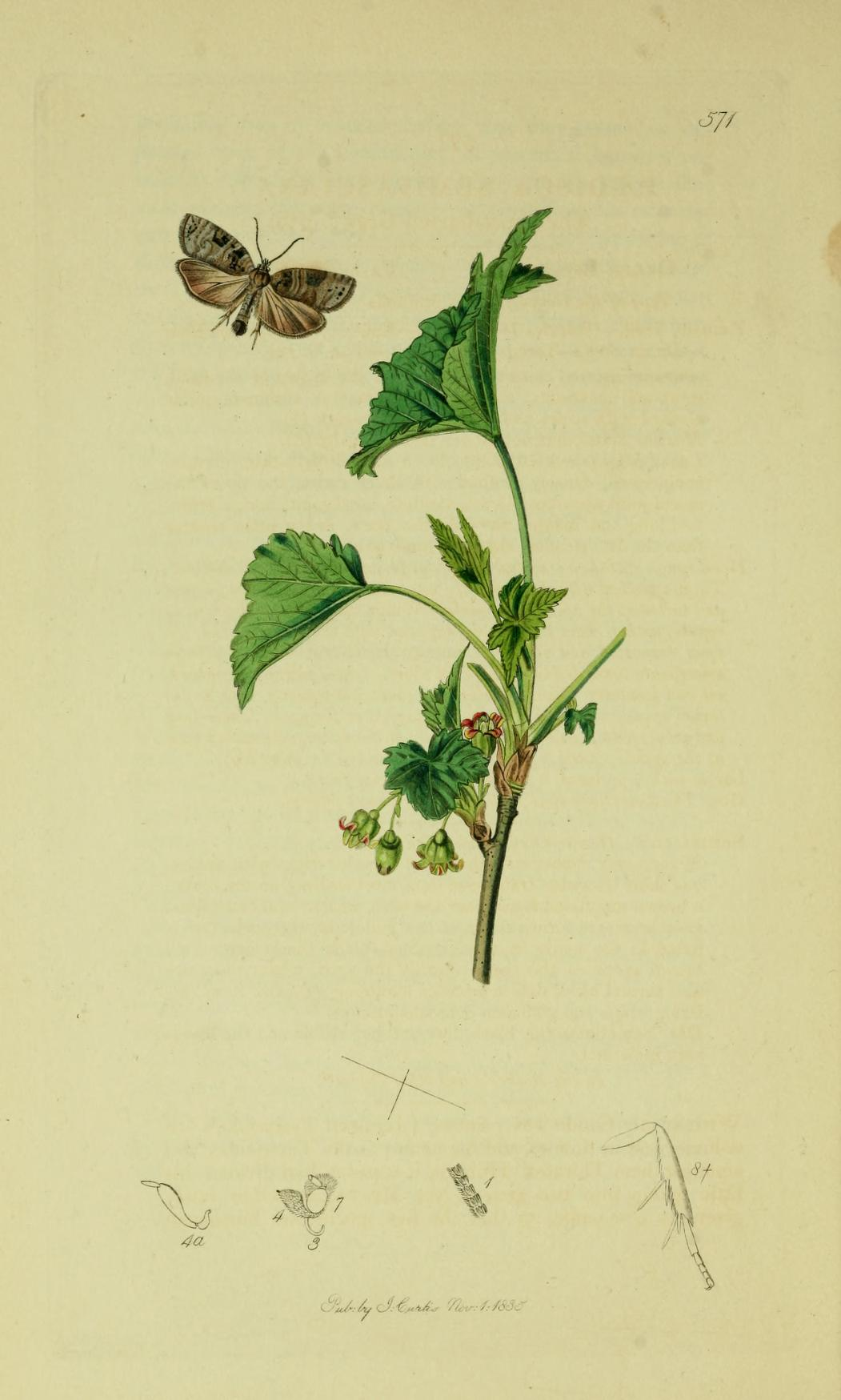
- Illustration from John Curtis's British Entomology Volume 6

Scientific classification
- Kingdom: Animalia
- Phylum: Arthropoda
- Clade: Pancrustacea
- Class: Insecta
- Order: Lepidoptera
- Family: Tortricidae
- Genus: Apotomis
- Species: A. semifasciana

Binomial name
- Apotomis semifasciana (Haworth, [1811])

Synonyms
- Tortrix semifasciana Haworth, [1811]; Paedisca semifasciana (Haworth, [1811]); Tortrix acutana Treitschke, 1835; Sericoris elutana Duponchel, in Godart, 1836

= Apotomis semifasciana =

Short-barred grey marble

Species of moth

Apotomis semifasciana, the short-barred grey marble, is a moth of the family Tortricidae. It was first described by the English entomologist Adrian Hardy Haworth in 1811.

== Life cycle ==
Ova

The eggs are laid on willows (Salix species).

Larva

The larva is green; dorsal and subdorsal lines darker; head and plate of 2 yellowish-green. The larvae feed on the catkins and later the leaves of willows in May and June.

Pupa

The blackish brown pupa can be found in a silken cocoon, spun between two leaves of the foodpant in June and July.

Imago

The wingspan is 17–20 mm. The head and thorax are grey. The forewings are grey, closely striated with whitish . The basal patch and a subtriangular central costal blotch are fuscous, black-marked, the apex of blotch truncate, marked with a black dash. The costa posteriorly is fuscous-spotted with a darker black-dotted subterminal mark in middle. The hindwings are grey, darker posteriorly. Julius von Kennel provides a full description.

Adults are on wing from July to August, flying from late evening onwards and coming to light and sugar.. During the day they rest in foliage and are not usually easily disturbed.

== Distribution ==
It is found in most of Europe, from Ireland to Russia.

== Notes ==
1. The flight season refers to Great Britain and Ireland. This may vary in other parts of the range.
