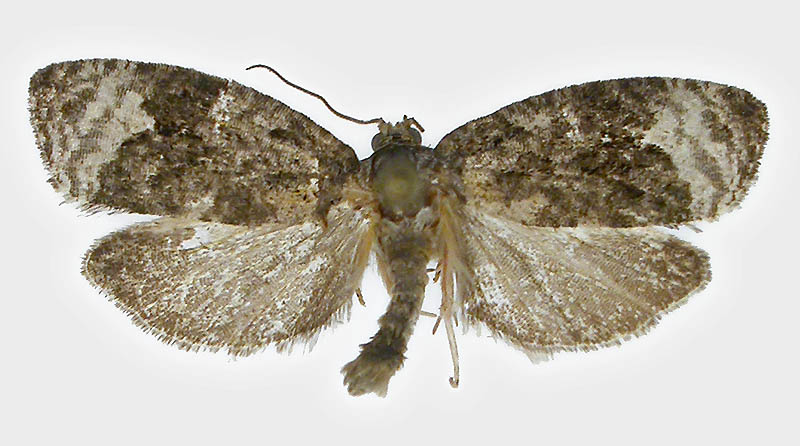

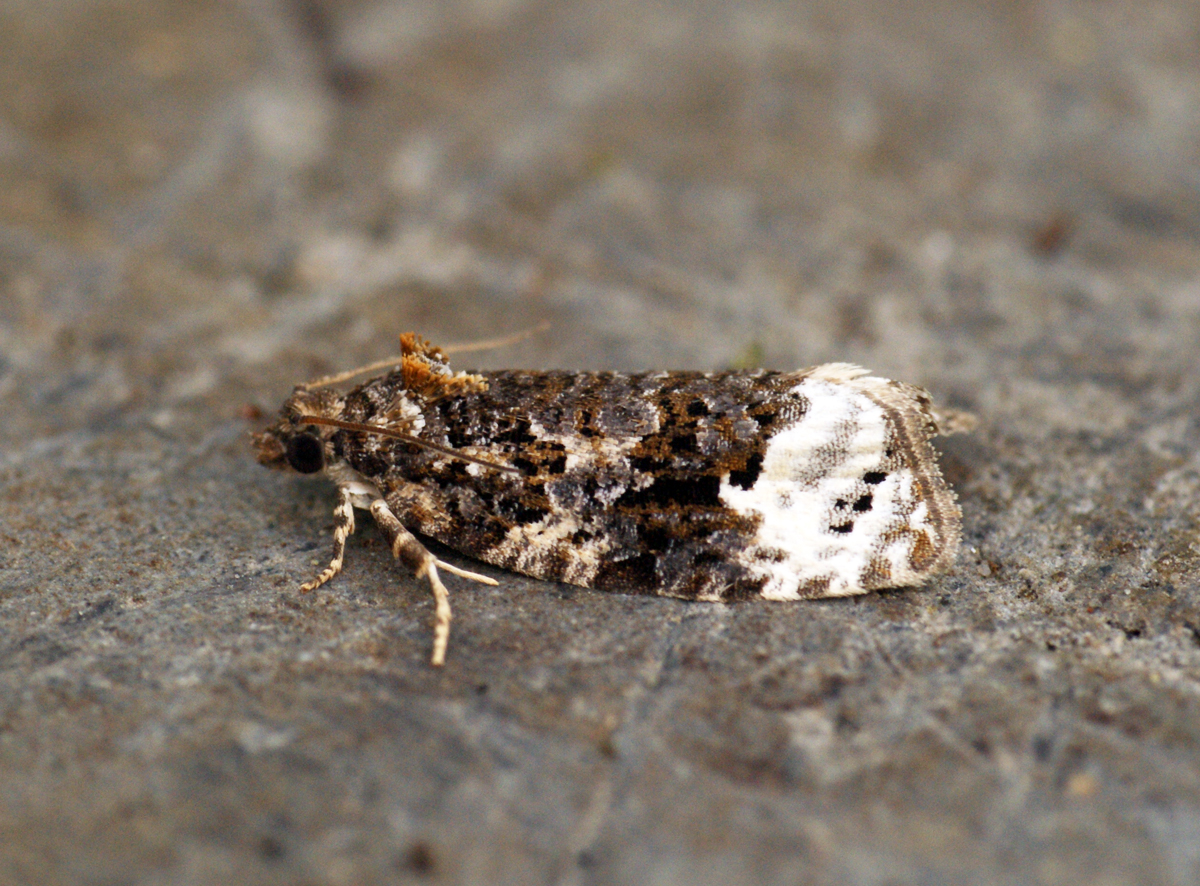

Scientific classification
- Kingdom: Animalia
- Phylum: Arthropoda
- Class: Insecta
- Order: Lepidoptera
- Family: Tortricidae
- Genus: Apotomis
- Species: A. capreana

Binomial name
- Apotomis capreana (Hübner, 1817)

Synonyms
- Tortrix capreana Hubner, [1817]; Argyroploce capreana f. sapporensis Matsumura, 1931

= Apotomis capreana =

Species of moth

Apotomis capreana is a moth of the family Tortricidae. It is found in most of Europe (except Iceland, the Iberian Peninsula, most of the Balkan Peninsula, and Ukraine), east to the eastern part of the Palearctic realm.

The wingspan is 17–22 mm. The forewings are white, sometimes ochreous - tinged, with some partly faint grey striae posteriorly. The basal patch, central fascia, and included space are brown mixed with dark ashy-fuscous and marked with black, slightly whitish-sprinkled, space more whitish towards costa. The posterior edge of fascia is slightly concave, in middle abruptly indented and there is a subapical group of several black dots. The hindwings are grey, darker posteriorly. The larva is greyish - green; dots black; head black. Julius von Kennel provides a full description.

Adults are on wing from June to August.

The larvae feed on Salix caprea. They feed inside spun leaves.
