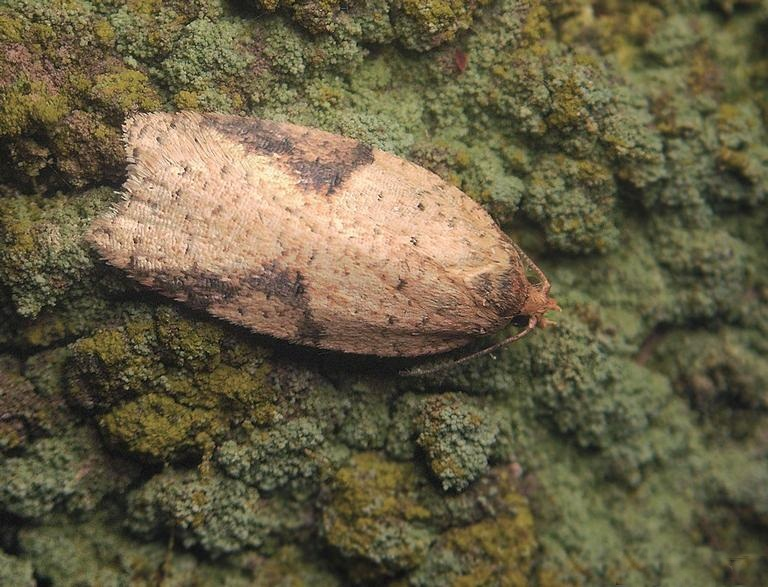

Scientific classification
- Kingdom: Animalia
- Phylum: Arthropoda
- Class: Insecta
- Order: Lepidoptera
- Family: Tortricidae
- Genus: Acleris
- Species: A. ferrugana

Binomial name
- Acleris ferrugana (Denis & Schiffermuller, 1775)

Synonyms
- Tortrix ferrugana Denis & Schiffermuller, 1775; Acalla ferrugana ab. alpinana Weber, 1945; Pyralis approximana Fabricius, 1798; Tortrix bifidana Haworth, [1811]; Tortrix brachiana Freyer, 1833; Peronea fissurana f. costimaculana Pierce, 1930; Peronea fissurana Pierce & Metcalfe, 1915; Pyralis fuscana Fabricius, 1787; Acleris lithargyrana Herrich-Schaffer, 1847; Teras lythargyrana Treitschke, 1830; Peronea fissurana var. multipunctana Pierce & Metcalfe, 1915; Acalla ferrugana f. radiana Hauder, 1913; Acleris rubidana Herrich-Schaffer, 1848; Tortrix (Teras) rubidana Herrich-Schaffer, 1851; Acleris selasana Herrich-Schaffer, 1849; Tortrix (Teras) selasana Herrich-Schaffer, 1851; Teras testaceana Zeller, 1849; Peronea fissurana f. trimaculana Pierce, 1930

= Acleris ferrugana =

Species of moth

Acleris ferrugana is a species of moth of the family Tortricidae. It is found in China, most of Europe and has also been recorded from North America.

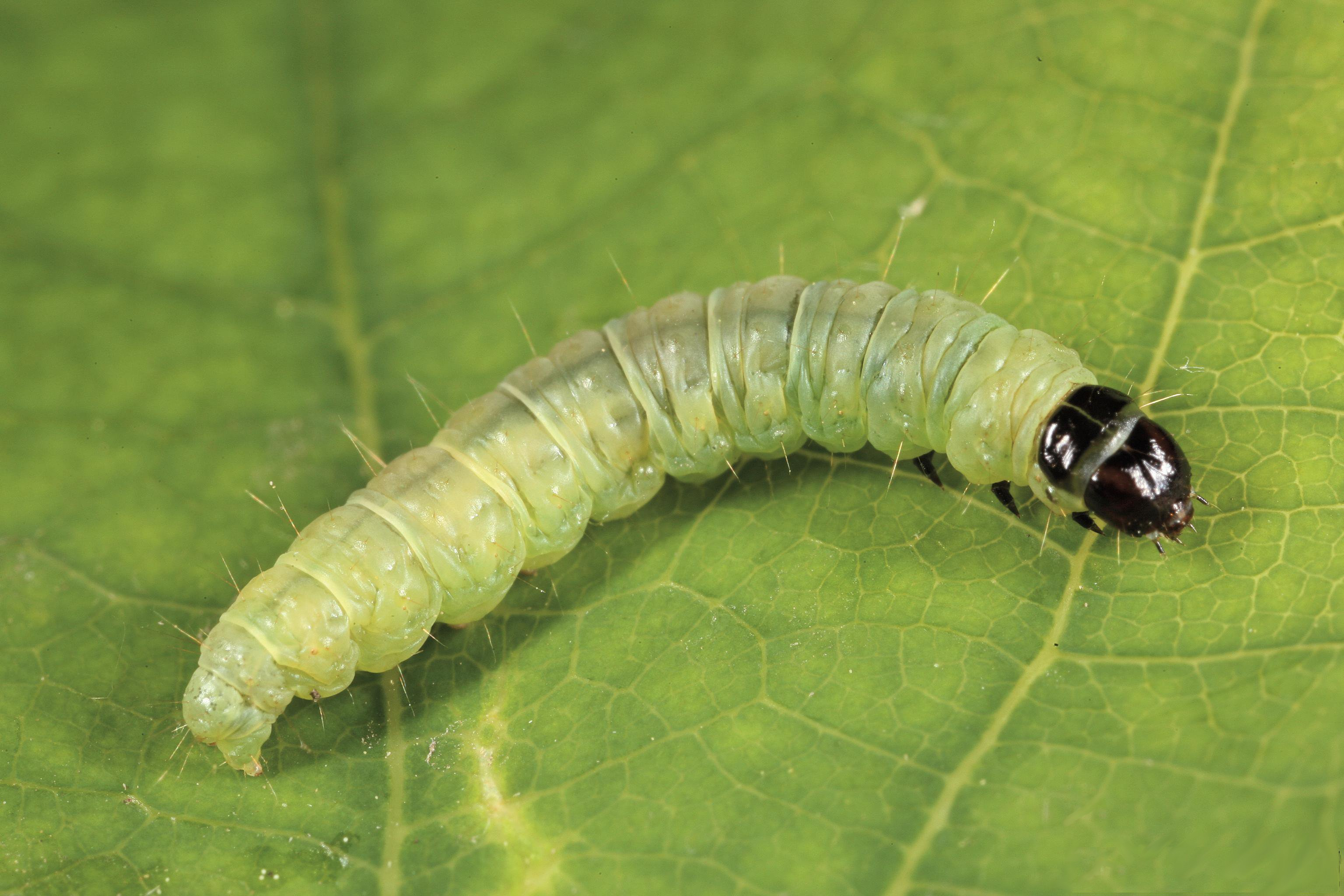
Larva

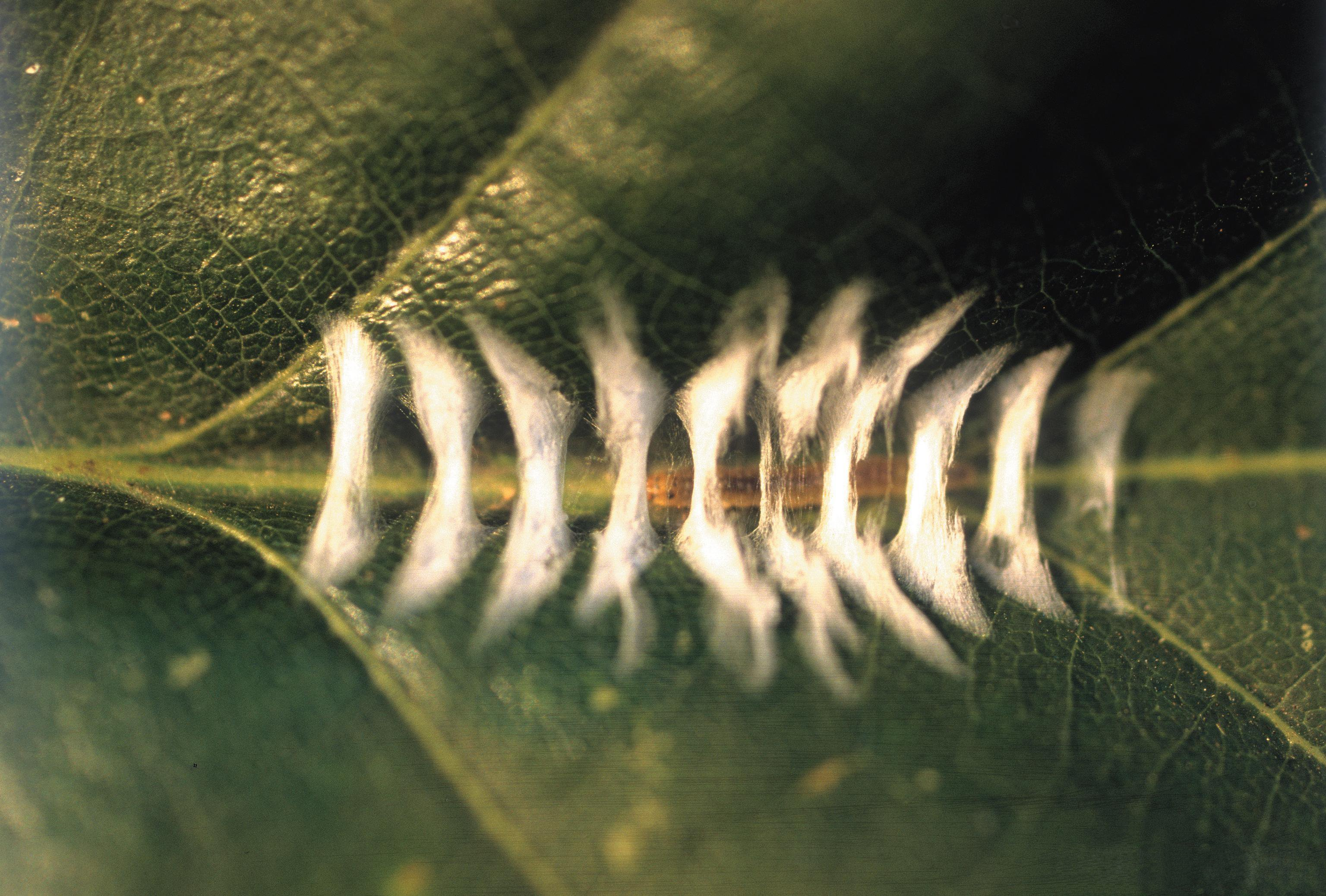
Larva feeding beneath webbing

The wingspan is 14–18 mm. The forewings are suboblong, pale ochreous to deep reddish-ochreous, darker-strigulated, sometimes strewn with blackish dots; tufts slight; two costal spots before and beyond middle and one in middle of disc grey, brownish, red-brown, or blackish. Hindwings whitish-grey, towards apex darker or grey-strigulated.The larva is pale green; dorsal line darker; head black or brown, plate of 2 more or less black. It is a very variable species. Some forms are very similar to Acleris notana and the two can only separated by examination of the genitalia. Julius von Kennel provides a full description.

Adults are on wing in July and again in September and October. The second generation overwinters and reappears in spring.

The larvae feed on Quercus species.
