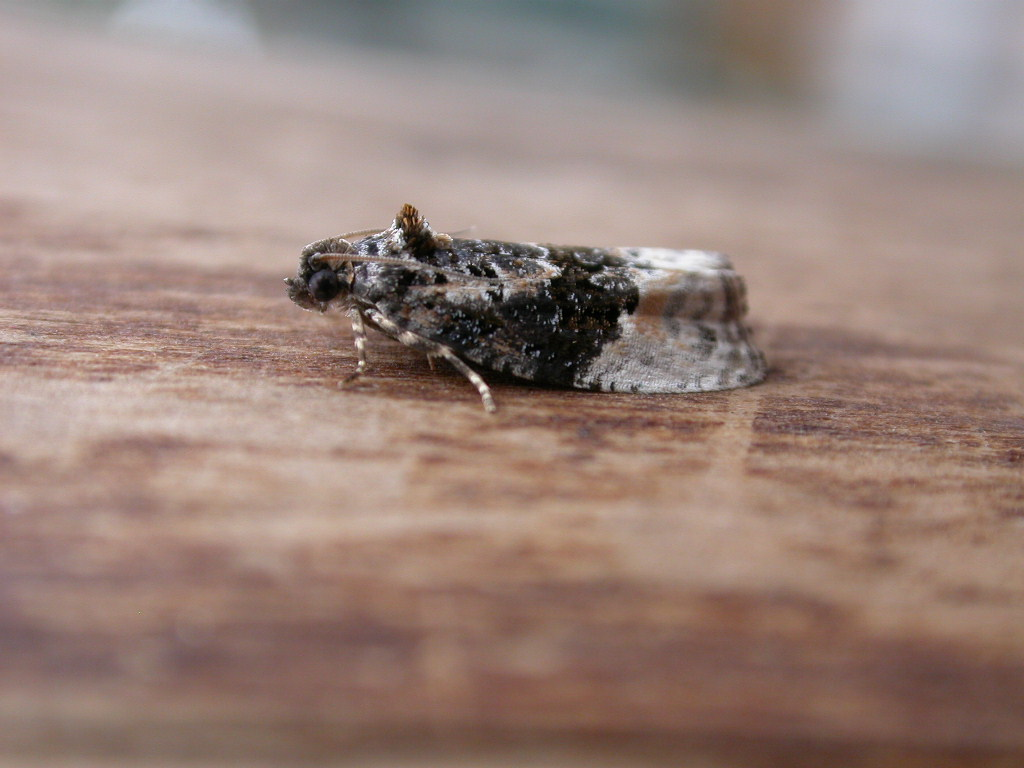

Scientific classification
- Kingdom: Animalia
- Phylum: Arthropoda
- Clade: Pancrustacea
- Class: Insecta
- Order: Lepidoptera
- Family: Tortricidae
- Genus: Apotomis
- Species: A. betuletana

Binomial name
- Apotomis betuletana (Haworth, 1811)

Synonyms
- Tortrix betuletana Haworth, 1811; Apotomis betulaetana Stephens, 1852; Penthina leucomelana Guenee, 1845

= Apotomis betuletana =

Species of moth

Apotomis betuletana is a moth of the family Tortricidae. It is found in most of Europe. It is also found in the eastern part of the Palearctic realm.

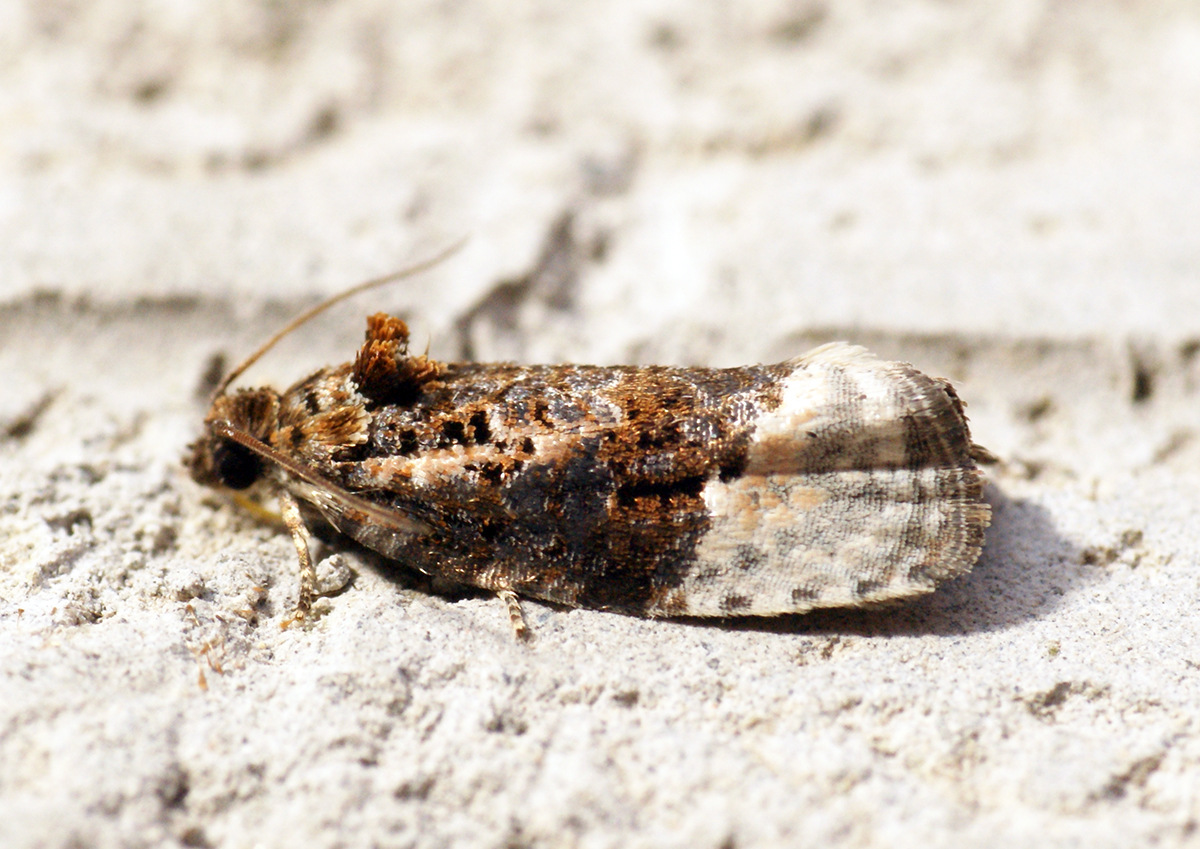

The wingspan is 16–20 mm. The forewings are white, sometimes partly ochreous - tinged, with some grey striae posteriorly. The basal patch and central fascia are dark brown, black -marked, the included space dark ashy-fuscous, all slightly whitish sprinkled, on fold sometimes more mixed with white. The posterior edge of fascia is nearly straight, followed in middle by a faint pinkish-ochreous tinge. Hindwings grey, darker posteriorly. The larva is green, incisions yellowish; dorsal and subdorsal lines grey-green; tubercular spots yellow; head yellow-green; plate of 2 pale green. Julius von Kennel provides a full description.

Adults are on wing from July to September.

The larvae feed on Betula species. They spin and roll the leaves of their host plant. The larvae can be found from May to June.
