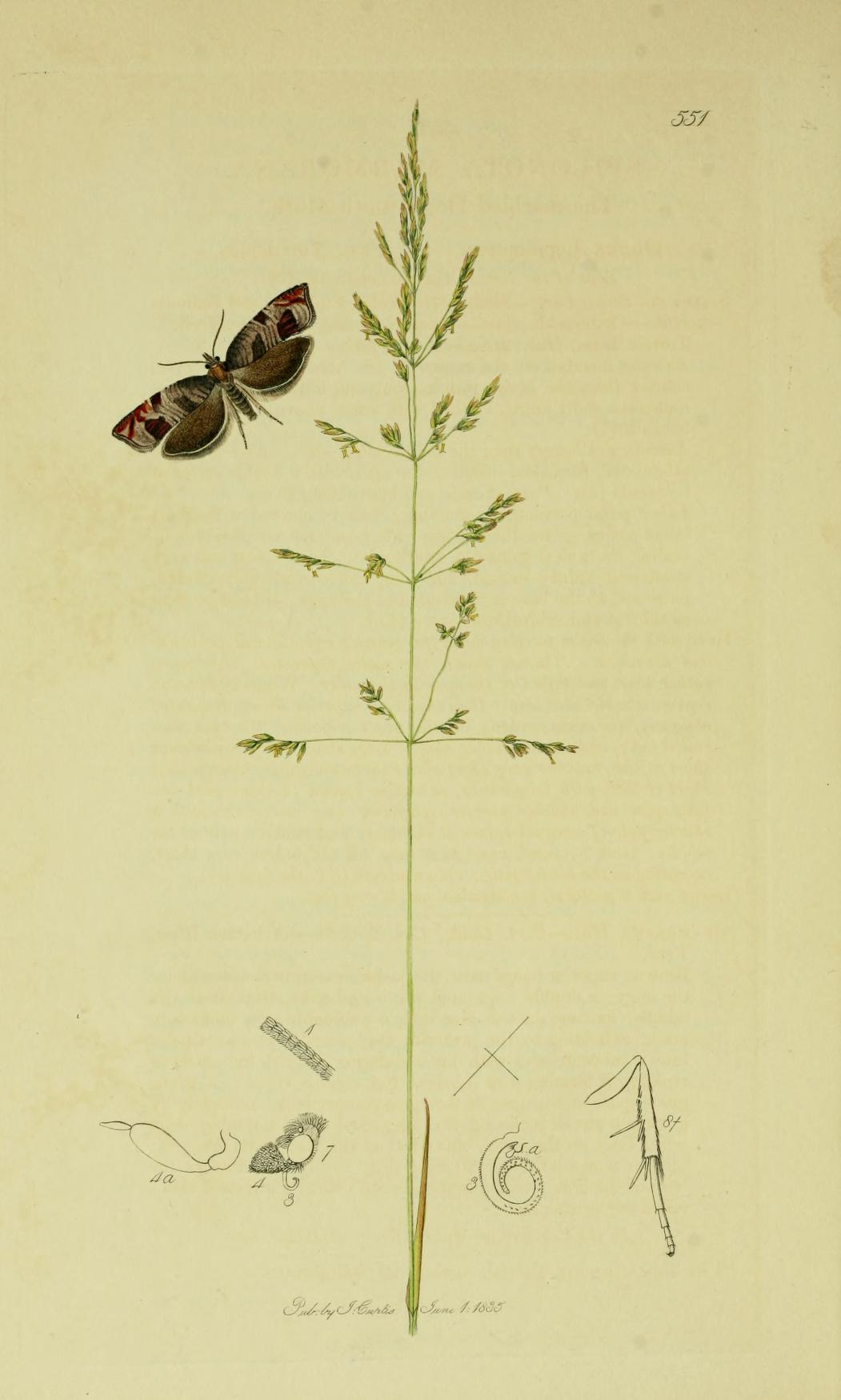
- Illustration from John Curtis's British Entomology Volume 6

Scientific classification
- Domain: Eukaryota
- Kingdom: Animalia
- Phylum: Arthropoda
- Class: Insecta
- Order: Lepidoptera
- Family: Tortricidae
- Genus: Acleris
- Species: A. maccana

Binomial name
- Acleris maccana (Treitschke, 1835)

Synonyms
- Teras maccana Treitschke, 1835; Teras basalticola Staudinger, 1857; Peronea maccana f. canescana Sheldon, 1930; Teras fishiana Fernald, 1882; Teras leporinana Zetterstedt, 1839; Peronea marmorana Curtis, 1834; Spilonota marmorana (Curtis, 1834); Tortrix repandana Werneburg, 1864; Peronea maccana f. suffusana Sheldon, 1930; Teras torquana Zetterstedt, 1839

= Acleris maccana =

Species of moth

Acleris maccana, the marbled dog's-tooth tortrix, is a moth of the family Tortricidae. The species was first described by Georg Friedrich Treitschke in 1835. It is found from Europe, east across the boreal regions to Siberia.

The wingspan is 19–25 mm. Adults are on wing in late fall and again in early spring. There is one generation per year.

The larvae feed on deciduous trees and shrubs, including Myrica (including Myrica gale), Vaccinium (including Vaccinium myrtillus and Vaccinium uliginosum), Rhododendron, Malus, Betula, Salix and Populus species.
