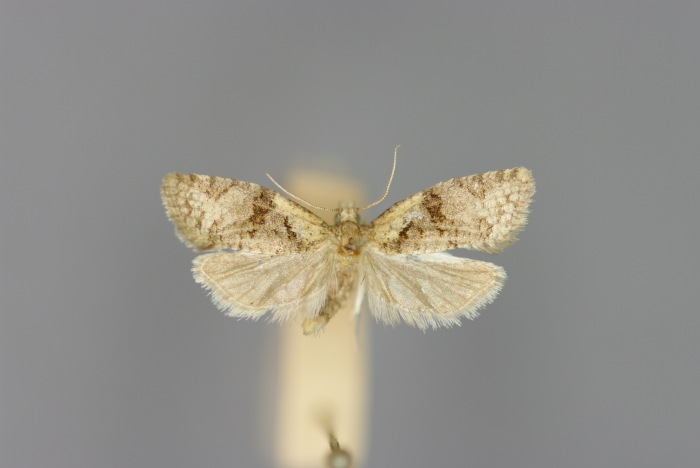

Scientific classification
- Domain: Eukaryota
- Kingdom: Animalia
- Phylum: Arthropoda
- Class: Insecta
- Order: Lepidoptera
- Family: Tortricidae
- Genus: Acleris
- Species: A. notana

Binomial name
- Acleris notana (Donovan, 1806)

Synonyms
- Tortrix notana Donovan, 1806; Acalla ferrugana ab. galacteana Krulikowsky, 1903; Tortrix gilvana Frolich, 1828; Tortrix ocherana Frolich, 1828; Teras proteana Guenee, 1845; Teras tripunctana var. sabulana Guenee, 1845; Acleris triana Hubner, [1825] 1816; Tortrix tripunctana Hubner, [1796-1799]; Tortrix tripunctulana Haworth, [1811]; Teras tripunctana ab. virgulana Reutti, 1898

= Acleris notana =

Species of moth

Acleris notana is a species of moth of the family Tortricidae. It is found in Iceland, Ireland, Great Britain, Spain, France, the Benelux, Germany, Denmark, Austria, Switzerland, Italy, the Czech Republic, Slovakia, Slovenia, Poland, Hungary, Romania, Norway, Sweden, Finland, the Baltic region, Ukraine and Russia. It is also found in North America, where it has been recorded from Illinois. The habitat consists of scrub, heathlands, moorlands and woodlands.

The wingspan is 15–17 mm. The species is very variable in color and can be quite difficult to distinguish from Acleris ferrugana, which also varies widely. The ground colour is usually light yellowish-brown. In the middle of the costal edge there are often three black or dark brown spots, these can be conjoined to form a V-shaped mark. The hindwings are white with grey suffusion on the veins.

Adults are on wing from July to April in two generations per year. Adults of the second generation overwinter and reappear in spring.

The larvae feed on Alnus glutinosa, Betula, Fagus, Populus, Rubus and Pyrus species. Larvae can be found from May to June and from August to September.
