= Coleophora algidella =

Scientific classification
- Kingdom: Animalia
- Phylum: Arthropoda
- Class: Insecta
- Order: Lepidoptera
- Family: Coleophoridae
- Genus: Coleophora
- Species: C. algidella

Binomial name
- Coleophora algidella Staudinger, 1857

Species of moth

Coleophora algidella is a moth of the family Coleophoridae. It is found in Spain, France, Switzerland, Italy, Norway and Iceland. It has also been recorded from China.

The wingspan is 11–13 mm.

== Subspecies ==
- Coleophora algidella algidella
- Coleophora algidella meridionalis Toll, 1960 (Spain, Switzerland)
- Coleophora algidella qinlingensis Li & Zheng, 1999 (China)
