= Eupithecia kozhantschikovi =

Scientific classification
- Domain: Eukaryota
- Kingdom: Animalia
- Phylum: Arthropoda
- Class: Insecta
- Order: Lepidoptera
- Family: Geometridae
- Genus: Eupithecia
- Species: E. kozhantschikovi

Binomial name
- Eupithecia kozhantschikovi Wehrli, 1929

Synonyms
- Eupithecia nanata kozhantschikovi Wehrli, 1929

Species of moth

Eupithecia kozhantschikovi is a moth in the family Geometridae. It is found in Russia.
